

599001–599100 

|-bgcolor=#fefefe
| 599001 ||  || — || July 30, 2009 || Charleston || R. Holmes ||  || align=right data-sort-value="0.57" | 570 m || 
|-id=002 bgcolor=#d6d6d6
| 599002 ||  || — || August 10, 2009 || Cerro Burek || Alianza S4 Obs. ||  || align=right | 1.5 km || 
|-id=003 bgcolor=#d6d6d6
| 599003 ||  || — || June 23, 2009 || Mount Lemmon || Mount Lemmon Survey ||  || align=right | 2.9 km || 
|-id=004 bgcolor=#d6d6d6
| 599004 ||  || — || August 14, 2009 || La Sagra || OAM Obs. ||  || align=right | 2.1 km || 
|-id=005 bgcolor=#d6d6d6
| 599005 ||  || — || August 15, 2009 || Catalina || CSS || VER || align=right | 3.3 km || 
|-id=006 bgcolor=#d6d6d6
| 599006 ||  || — || August 15, 2009 || Kitt Peak || Spacewatch ||  || align=right | 2.9 km || 
|-id=007 bgcolor=#d6d6d6
| 599007 ||  || — || August 15, 2009 || Kitt Peak || Spacewatch || 3:2 || align=right | 3.6 km || 
|-id=008 bgcolor=#fefefe
| 599008 ||  || — || February 26, 2012 || Mount Lemmon || Mount Lemmon Survey ||  || align=right | 1.0 km || 
|-id=009 bgcolor=#d6d6d6
| 599009 ||  || — || September 8, 2015 || XuYi || PMO NEO ||  || align=right | 2.8 km || 
|-id=010 bgcolor=#fefefe
| 599010 ||  || — || August 17, 2009 || Tzec Maun || E. Schwab ||  || align=right data-sort-value="0.73" | 730 m || 
|-id=011 bgcolor=#E9E9E9
| 599011 ||  || — || August 16, 2009 || Catalina || CSS ||  || align=right | 1.5 km || 
|-id=012 bgcolor=#d6d6d6
| 599012 ||  || — || August 16, 2009 || La Sagra || OAM Obs. ||  || align=right | 2.6 km || 
|-id=013 bgcolor=#d6d6d6
| 599013 ||  || — || October 4, 2004 || Palomar || NEAT ||  || align=right | 2.9 km || 
|-id=014 bgcolor=#fefefe
| 599014 ||  || — || July 27, 2005 || Palomar || NEAT ||  || align=right data-sort-value="0.99" | 990 m || 
|-id=015 bgcolor=#d6d6d6
| 599015 ||  || — || August 19, 2009 || La Sagra || OAM Obs. ||  || align=right | 2.9 km || 
|-id=016 bgcolor=#d6d6d6
| 599016 ||  || — || August 20, 2009 || La Sagra || OAM Obs. ||  || align=right | 3.7 km || 
|-id=017 bgcolor=#E9E9E9
| 599017 ||  || — || August 23, 2009 || Taunus || R. Kling, U. Zimmer ||  || align=right | 1.6 km || 
|-id=018 bgcolor=#fefefe
| 599018 ||  || — || August 13, 2002 || Palomar || NEAT ||  || align=right data-sort-value="0.71" | 710 m || 
|-id=019 bgcolor=#d6d6d6
| 599019 ||  || — || August 29, 2009 || Zelenchukskaya Stn || T. V. Kryachko, B. Satovski ||  || align=right | 1.9 km || 
|-id=020 bgcolor=#E9E9E9
| 599020 ||  || — || August 28, 2009 || Kitt Peak || Spacewatch ||  || align=right | 1.9 km || 
|-id=021 bgcolor=#d6d6d6
| 599021 ||  || — || August 27, 2009 || Kitt Peak || Spacewatch ||  || align=right | 2.4 km || 
|-id=022 bgcolor=#d6d6d6
| 599022 ||  || — || August 17, 2009 || Kitt Peak || Spacewatch ||  || align=right | 2.3 km || 
|-id=023 bgcolor=#E9E9E9
| 599023 ||  || — || December 1, 2005 || Palomar || NEAT ||  || align=right | 1.6 km || 
|-id=024 bgcolor=#d6d6d6
| 599024 ||  || — || August 27, 2009 || Kitt Peak || Spacewatch ||  || align=right | 2.5 km || 
|-id=025 bgcolor=#d6d6d6
| 599025 ||  || — || August 16, 2009 || Catalina || CSS ||  || align=right | 3.0 km || 
|-id=026 bgcolor=#fefefe
| 599026 ||  || — || August 16, 2009 || Kitt Peak || Spacewatch ||  || align=right data-sort-value="0.67" | 670 m || 
|-id=027 bgcolor=#fefefe
| 599027 ||  || — || March 14, 2005 || Mount Lemmon || Mount Lemmon Survey ||  || align=right data-sort-value="0.58" | 580 m || 
|-id=028 bgcolor=#d6d6d6
| 599028 ||  || — || August 27, 2009 || Kitt Peak || Spacewatch ||  || align=right | 3.1 km || 
|-id=029 bgcolor=#d6d6d6
| 599029 ||  || — || August 17, 2009 || Kitt Peak || Spacewatch ||  || align=right | 2.6 km || 
|-id=030 bgcolor=#fefefe
| 599030 ||  || — || February 28, 2012 || Haleakala || Pan-STARRS ||  || align=right data-sort-value="0.67" | 670 m || 
|-id=031 bgcolor=#d6d6d6
| 599031 ||  || — || August 19, 2009 || Catalina || CSS ||  || align=right | 4.2 km || 
|-id=032 bgcolor=#d6d6d6
| 599032 ||  || — || February 3, 2012 || Haleakala || Pan-STARRS ||  || align=right | 3.5 km || 
|-id=033 bgcolor=#d6d6d6
| 599033 ||  || — || August 18, 2009 || Kitt Peak || Spacewatch ||  || align=right | 2.3 km || 
|-id=034 bgcolor=#d6d6d6
| 599034 ||  || — || February 23, 2018 || Mount Lemmon || Mount Lemmon Survey ||  || align=right | 2.1 km || 
|-id=035 bgcolor=#d6d6d6
| 599035 ||  || — || August 18, 2009 || Kitt Peak || Spacewatch ||  || align=right | 2.5 km || 
|-id=036 bgcolor=#fefefe
| 599036 ||  || — || August 16, 2009 || Kitt Peak || Spacewatch ||  || align=right data-sort-value="0.58" | 580 m || 
|-id=037 bgcolor=#fefefe
| 599037 ||  || — || August 28, 2009 || Kitt Peak || Spacewatch ||  || align=right data-sort-value="0.66" | 660 m || 
|-id=038 bgcolor=#fefefe
| 599038 ||  || — || August 20, 2009 || Kitt Peak || Spacewatch ||  || align=right data-sort-value="0.59" | 590 m || 
|-id=039 bgcolor=#d6d6d6
| 599039 ||  || — || August 16, 2009 || Kitt Peak || Spacewatch ||  || align=right | 2.5 km || 
|-id=040 bgcolor=#d6d6d6
| 599040 ||  || — || August 17, 2009 || Kitt Peak || Spacewatch ||  || align=right | 3.0 km || 
|-id=041 bgcolor=#E9E9E9
| 599041 ||  || — || August 27, 2009 || Kitt Peak || Spacewatch ||  || align=right | 1.4 km || 
|-id=042 bgcolor=#fefefe
| 599042 ||  || — || August 29, 2009 || Kitt Peak || Spacewatch ||  || align=right data-sort-value="0.55" | 550 m || 
|-id=043 bgcolor=#C2FFFF
| 599043 ||  || — || September 7, 2008 || Mount Lemmon || Mount Lemmon Survey || L4 || align=right | 6.0 km || 
|-id=044 bgcolor=#d6d6d6
| 599044 ||  || — || September 14, 2009 || Catalina || CSS ||  || align=right | 4.4 km || 
|-id=045 bgcolor=#d6d6d6
| 599045 ||  || — || September 15, 2009 || Mount Lemmon || Mount Lemmon Survey ||  || align=right | 2.8 km || 
|-id=046 bgcolor=#fefefe
| 599046 ||  || — || May 20, 2005 || Mount Lemmon || Mount Lemmon Survey ||  || align=right data-sort-value="0.64" | 640 m || 
|-id=047 bgcolor=#C2FFFF
| 599047 ||  || — || September 14, 2009 || Kitt Peak || Spacewatch || L4 || align=right | 7.7 km || 
|-id=048 bgcolor=#fefefe
| 599048 ||  || — || July 29, 2009 || Kitt Peak || Spacewatch ||  || align=right data-sort-value="0.58" | 580 m || 
|-id=049 bgcolor=#E9E9E9
| 599049 ||  || — || September 15, 2009 || Kitt Peak || Spacewatch ||  || align=right | 1.7 km || 
|-id=050 bgcolor=#d6d6d6
| 599050 ||  || — || September 15, 2009 || Kitt Peak || Spacewatch ||  || align=right | 3.4 km || 
|-id=051 bgcolor=#E9E9E9
| 599051 ||  || — || November 6, 2005 || Mount Lemmon || Mount Lemmon Survey ||  || align=right | 1.5 km || 
|-id=052 bgcolor=#d6d6d6
| 599052 ||  || — || September 15, 2009 || Kitt Peak || Spacewatch ||  || align=right | 2.1 km || 
|-id=053 bgcolor=#C2FFFF
| 599053 ||  || — || September 15, 2009 || Kitt Peak || Spacewatch || L4 || align=right | 6.7 km || 
|-id=054 bgcolor=#C2FFFF
| 599054 ||  || — || September 15, 2009 || Kitt Peak || Spacewatch || L4 || align=right | 6.6 km || 
|-id=055 bgcolor=#C2FFFF
| 599055 ||  || — || February 13, 2002 || Apache Point || SDSS Collaboration || L4 || align=right | 6.7 km || 
|-id=056 bgcolor=#d6d6d6
| 599056 ||  || — || July 30, 2009 || Kitt Peak || Spacewatch ||  || align=right | 2.1 km || 
|-id=057 bgcolor=#fefefe
| 599057 ||  || — || April 17, 2012 || Kitt Peak || Spacewatch ||  || align=right data-sort-value="0.61" | 610 m || 
|-id=058 bgcolor=#d6d6d6
| 599058 ||  || — || January 14, 2012 || Kitt Peak || Spacewatch ||  || align=right | 2.8 km || 
|-id=059 bgcolor=#d6d6d6
| 599059 ||  || — || September 15, 2009 || Kitt Peak || Spacewatch ||  || align=right | 2.4 km || 
|-id=060 bgcolor=#C2FFFF
| 599060 ||  || — || September 15, 2009 || Kitt Peak || Spacewatch || L4 || align=right | 6.7 km || 
|-id=061 bgcolor=#C2FFFF
| 599061 ||  || — || September 15, 2009 || Kitt Peak || Spacewatch || L4 || align=right | 6.2 km || 
|-id=062 bgcolor=#E9E9E9
| 599062 ||  || — || September 15, 2009 || Kitt Peak || Spacewatch ||  || align=right | 1.6 km || 
|-id=063 bgcolor=#d6d6d6
| 599063 ||  || — || September 15, 2009 || Kitt Peak || Spacewatch ||  || align=right | 2.2 km || 
|-id=064 bgcolor=#d6d6d6
| 599064 ||  || — || September 12, 2009 || Kitt Peak || Spacewatch ||  || align=right | 2.6 km || 
|-id=065 bgcolor=#d6d6d6
| 599065 ||  || — || September 15, 2009 || Kitt Peak || Spacewatch ||  || align=right | 2.1 km || 
|-id=066 bgcolor=#d6d6d6
| 599066 ||  || — || September 16, 2009 || Mount Lemmon || Mount Lemmon Survey ||  || align=right | 3.1 km || 
|-id=067 bgcolor=#d6d6d6
| 599067 ||  || — || September 16, 2009 || Mount Lemmon || Mount Lemmon Survey ||  || align=right | 2.6 km || 
|-id=068 bgcolor=#d6d6d6
| 599068 ||  || — || September 16, 2009 || Mount Lemmon || Mount Lemmon Survey ||  || align=right | 3.3 km || 
|-id=069 bgcolor=#C2FFFF
| 599069 ||  || — || September 16, 2009 || Kitt Peak || Spacewatch || L4 || align=right | 6.5 km || 
|-id=070 bgcolor=#d6d6d6
| 599070 ||  || — || March 24, 2001 || Kitt Peak || Spacewatch ||  || align=right | 2.9 km || 
|-id=071 bgcolor=#d6d6d6
| 599071 ||  || — || September 16, 2009 || Kitt Peak || Spacewatch ||  || align=right | 2.5 km || 
|-id=072 bgcolor=#C2FFFF
| 599072 ||  || — || November 27, 1998 || Kitt Peak || Spacewatch || L4 || align=right | 6.7 km || 
|-id=073 bgcolor=#fefefe
| 599073 ||  || — || September 17, 2009 || Kitt Peak || Spacewatch ||  || align=right data-sort-value="0.65" | 650 m || 
|-id=074 bgcolor=#d6d6d6
| 599074 ||  || — || September 17, 2009 || Mount Lemmon || Mount Lemmon Survey ||  || align=right | 2.7 km || 
|-id=075 bgcolor=#E9E9E9
| 599075 ||  || — || September 17, 2009 || Mount Lemmon || Mount Lemmon Survey ||  || align=right | 1.0 km || 
|-id=076 bgcolor=#d6d6d6
| 599076 ||  || — || August 29, 2009 || Kitt Peak || Spacewatch ||  || align=right | 1.8 km || 
|-id=077 bgcolor=#E9E9E9
| 599077 ||  || — || September 18, 2009 || Mount Lemmon || Mount Lemmon Survey ||  || align=right | 1.2 km || 
|-id=078 bgcolor=#E9E9E9
| 599078 ||  || — || August 15, 2009 || Kitt Peak || Spacewatch ||  || align=right | 1.7 km || 
|-id=079 bgcolor=#d6d6d6
| 599079 ||  || — || September 18, 2009 || Mount Lemmon || Mount Lemmon Survey ||  || align=right | 2.5 km || 
|-id=080 bgcolor=#d6d6d6
| 599080 ||  || — || September 18, 2009 || Mount Lemmon || Mount Lemmon Survey ||  || align=right | 2.1 km || 
|-id=081 bgcolor=#fefefe
| 599081 ||  || — || April 20, 2004 || Kitt Peak || Spacewatch ||  || align=right data-sort-value="0.84" | 840 m || 
|-id=082 bgcolor=#d6d6d6
| 599082 ||  || — || August 29, 2009 || Kitt Peak || Spacewatch ||  || align=right | 2.3 km || 
|-id=083 bgcolor=#fefefe
| 599083 ||  || — || September 24, 2009 || Zelenchukskaya Stn || T. V. Kryachko, B. Satovski || H || align=right data-sort-value="0.59" | 590 m || 
|-id=084 bgcolor=#E9E9E9
| 599084 ||  || — || September 23, 2009 || Zelenchukskaya Stn || T. V. Kryachko, B. Satovski || JUN || align=right | 1.3 km || 
|-id=085 bgcolor=#d6d6d6
| 599085 ||  || — || September 16, 2009 || Kitt Peak || Spacewatch ||  || align=right | 2.2 km || 
|-id=086 bgcolor=#d6d6d6
| 599086 ||  || — || September 16, 2009 || Mount Lemmon || Mount Lemmon Survey ||  || align=right | 2.4 km || 
|-id=087 bgcolor=#d6d6d6
| 599087 ||  || — || September 17, 2009 || Kitt Peak || Spacewatch ||  || align=right | 2.9 km || 
|-id=088 bgcolor=#E9E9E9
| 599088 ||  || — || September 17, 2009 || Mount Lemmon || Mount Lemmon Survey ||  || align=right | 1.5 km || 
|-id=089 bgcolor=#fefefe
| 599089 ||  || — || September 18, 2009 || Kitt Peak || Spacewatch ||  || align=right data-sort-value="0.61" | 610 m || 
|-id=090 bgcolor=#E9E9E9
| 599090 ||  || — || October 29, 2005 || Catalina || CSS ||  || align=right | 1.4 km || 
|-id=091 bgcolor=#d6d6d6
| 599091 ||  || — || September 29, 2003 || Apache Point || SDSS Collaboration ||  || align=right | 3.1 km || 
|-id=092 bgcolor=#fefefe
| 599092 ||  || — || September 20, 2009 || Kitt Peak || Spacewatch ||  || align=right data-sort-value="0.90" | 900 m || 
|-id=093 bgcolor=#d6d6d6
| 599093 ||  || — || September 20, 2009 || Kitt Peak || Spacewatch || 3:2 || align=right | 3.7 km || 
|-id=094 bgcolor=#fefefe
| 599094 ||  || — || February 16, 2007 || Mount Lemmon || Mount Lemmon Survey ||  || align=right data-sort-value="0.72" | 720 m || 
|-id=095 bgcolor=#fefefe
| 599095 ||  || — || August 27, 2005 || Kitt Peak || Spacewatch ||  || align=right data-sort-value="0.74" | 740 m || 
|-id=096 bgcolor=#d6d6d6
| 599096 ||  || — || December 25, 2005 || Kitt Peak || Spacewatch ||  || align=right | 2.7 km || 
|-id=097 bgcolor=#C2FFFF
| 599097 ||  || — || September 18, 2009 || Kitt Peak || Spacewatch || L4 || align=right | 6.4 km || 
|-id=098 bgcolor=#d6d6d6
| 599098 ||  || — || September 18, 2009 || Catalina || CSS ||  || align=right | 2.6 km || 
|-id=099 bgcolor=#d6d6d6
| 599099 ||  || — || September 18, 2009 || Mount Lemmon || Mount Lemmon Survey ||  || align=right | 2.3 km || 
|-id=100 bgcolor=#d6d6d6
| 599100 ||  || — || September 19, 1998 || Apache Point || SDSS Collaboration ||  || align=right | 2.2 km || 
|}

599101–599200 

|-bgcolor=#d6d6d6
| 599101 ||  || — || September 19, 2009 || Mount Lemmon || Mount Lemmon Survey ||  || align=right | 3.0 km || 
|-id=102 bgcolor=#d6d6d6
| 599102 ||  || — || September 20, 2009 || Kitt Peak || Spacewatch ||  || align=right | 2.5 km || 
|-id=103 bgcolor=#E9E9E9
| 599103 ||  || — || September 20, 2009 || Kitt Peak || Spacewatch ||  || align=right | 1.3 km || 
|-id=104 bgcolor=#d6d6d6
| 599104 ||  || — || September 17, 2003 || Kitt Peak || Spacewatch ||  || align=right | 2.7 km || 
|-id=105 bgcolor=#C2FFFF
| 599105 ||  || — || September 17, 2009 || Kitt Peak || Spacewatch || L4 || align=right | 7.2 km || 
|-id=106 bgcolor=#d6d6d6
| 599106 ||  || — || September 21, 2009 || Kitt Peak || Spacewatch ||  || align=right | 2.5 km || 
|-id=107 bgcolor=#d6d6d6
| 599107 ||  || — || September 21, 2009 || Kitt Peak || Spacewatch ||  || align=right | 2.1 km || 
|-id=108 bgcolor=#d6d6d6
| 599108 ||  || — || September 22, 2009 || Kitt Peak || Spacewatch ||  || align=right | 2.4 km || 
|-id=109 bgcolor=#fefefe
| 599109 ||  || — || September 22, 2009 || Kitt Peak || Spacewatch ||  || align=right data-sort-value="0.81" | 810 m || 
|-id=110 bgcolor=#d6d6d6
| 599110 ||  || — || September 22, 2009 || Catalina || CSS ||  || align=right | 2.4 km || 
|-id=111 bgcolor=#C2FFFF
| 599111 ||  || — || September 22, 2009 || Kitt Peak || Spacewatch || L4 || align=right | 7.3 km || 
|-id=112 bgcolor=#d6d6d6
| 599112 ||  || — || September 23, 2009 || Kitt Peak || Spacewatch ||  || align=right | 3.2 km || 
|-id=113 bgcolor=#C2FFFF
| 599113 ||  || — || September 23, 2009 || Kitt Peak || Spacewatch || L4 || align=right | 7.1 km || 
|-id=114 bgcolor=#fefefe
| 599114 ||  || — || March 29, 2004 || Kitt Peak || Spacewatch ||  || align=right data-sort-value="0.81" | 810 m || 
|-id=115 bgcolor=#E9E9E9
| 599115 ||  || — || September 23, 2009 || Kitt Peak || Spacewatch ||  || align=right | 1.4 km || 
|-id=116 bgcolor=#d6d6d6
| 599116 ||  || — || September 15, 2009 || Kitt Peak || Spacewatch ||  || align=right | 3.0 km || 
|-id=117 bgcolor=#d6d6d6
| 599117 ||  || — || September 24, 2009 || Mount Lemmon || Mount Lemmon Survey ||  || align=right | 2.6 km || 
|-id=118 bgcolor=#d6d6d6
| 599118 ||  || — || September 24, 2009 || Kitt Peak || Spacewatch ||  || align=right | 2.4 km || 
|-id=119 bgcolor=#d6d6d6
| 599119 ||  || — || September 25, 2009 || Mount Lemmon || Mount Lemmon Survey ||  || align=right | 2.1 km || 
|-id=120 bgcolor=#d6d6d6
| 599120 ||  || — || September 25, 2009 || Mount Lemmon || Mount Lemmon Survey ||  || align=right | 2.0 km || 
|-id=121 bgcolor=#C2FFFF
| 599121 ||  || — || September 26, 2009 || Kitt Peak || Spacewatch || L4 || align=right | 5.4 km || 
|-id=122 bgcolor=#fefefe
| 599122 ||  || — || September 20, 2009 || Mount Lemmon || Mount Lemmon Survey ||  || align=right data-sort-value="0.83" | 830 m || 
|-id=123 bgcolor=#E9E9E9
| 599123 ||  || — || September 22, 2009 || Catalina || CSS ||  || align=right | 1.5 km || 
|-id=124 bgcolor=#d6d6d6
| 599124 ||  || — || September 17, 2009 || Kitt Peak || Spacewatch ||  || align=right | 2.2 km || 
|-id=125 bgcolor=#C2FFFF
| 599125 ||  || — || September 17, 2009 || Kitt Peak || Spacewatch || L4 || align=right | 6.8 km || 
|-id=126 bgcolor=#C2FFFF
| 599126 ||  || — || September 17, 2009 || Kitt Peak || Spacewatch || L4 || align=right | 5.9 km || 
|-id=127 bgcolor=#C2FFFF
| 599127 ||  || — || September 18, 2009 || Kitt Peak || Spacewatch || L4 || align=right | 6.8 km || 
|-id=128 bgcolor=#E9E9E9
| 599128 ||  || — || September 16, 2009 || Siding Spring || SSS ||  || align=right | 1.4 km || 
|-id=129 bgcolor=#fefefe
| 599129 ||  || — || August 28, 2009 || Kitt Peak || Spacewatch ||  || align=right data-sort-value="0.58" | 580 m || 
|-id=130 bgcolor=#E9E9E9
| 599130 ||  || — || September 16, 2009 || Kitt Peak || Spacewatch ||  || align=right | 1.6 km || 
|-id=131 bgcolor=#d6d6d6
| 599131 ||  || — || September 25, 2009 || Kitt Peak || Spacewatch ||  || align=right | 2.2 km || 
|-id=132 bgcolor=#E9E9E9
| 599132 ||  || — || March 31, 2008 || Kitt Peak || Spacewatch ||  || align=right | 2.4 km || 
|-id=133 bgcolor=#C2FFFF
| 599133 ||  || — || September 25, 2009 || Kitt Peak || Spacewatch || L4 || align=right | 7.6 km || 
|-id=134 bgcolor=#fefefe
| 599134 ||  || — || September 25, 2009 || Kitt Peak || Spacewatch ||  || align=right data-sort-value="0.81" | 810 m || 
|-id=135 bgcolor=#d6d6d6
| 599135 ||  || — || September 25, 2009 || Kitt Peak || Spacewatch || HYG || align=right | 2.0 km || 
|-id=136 bgcolor=#fefefe
| 599136 ||  || — || September 29, 2001 || Palomar || NEAT || H || align=right data-sort-value="0.65" | 650 m || 
|-id=137 bgcolor=#fefefe
| 599137 ||  || — || October 4, 1999 || Kitt Peak || Spacewatch ||  || align=right data-sort-value="0.54" | 540 m || 
|-id=138 bgcolor=#fefefe
| 599138 ||  || — || May 14, 2005 || Mount Lemmon || Mount Lemmon Survey ||  || align=right data-sort-value="0.60" | 600 m || 
|-id=139 bgcolor=#E9E9E9
| 599139 ||  || — || September 26, 2009 || Kitt Peak || Spacewatch ||  || align=right | 1.3 km || 
|-id=140 bgcolor=#d6d6d6
| 599140 ||  || — || September 16, 2009 || Kitt Peak || Spacewatch ||  || align=right | 2.1 km || 
|-id=141 bgcolor=#fefefe
| 599141 ||  || — || August 20, 2009 || Kitt Peak || Spacewatch ||  || align=right data-sort-value="0.65" | 650 m || 
|-id=142 bgcolor=#fefefe
| 599142 ||  || — || August 20, 2009 || Kitt Peak || Spacewatch ||  || align=right data-sort-value="0.67" | 670 m || 
|-id=143 bgcolor=#C2FFFF
| 599143 ||  || — || September 7, 2008 || Mount Lemmon || Mount Lemmon Survey || L4 || align=right | 7.3 km || 
|-id=144 bgcolor=#d6d6d6
| 599144 ||  || — || September 18, 2009 || Mount Lemmon || Mount Lemmon Survey ||  || align=right | 1.7 km || 
|-id=145 bgcolor=#d6d6d6
| 599145 ||  || — || September 19, 2009 || Mount Lemmon || Mount Lemmon Survey ||  || align=right | 2.5 km || 
|-id=146 bgcolor=#d6d6d6
| 599146 ||  || — || August 27, 2009 || Kitt Peak || Spacewatch ||  || align=right | 2.2 km || 
|-id=147 bgcolor=#d6d6d6
| 599147 ||  || — || September 20, 2009 || Kitt Peak || Spacewatch ||  || align=right | 2.7 km || 
|-id=148 bgcolor=#d6d6d6
| 599148 ||  || — || August 15, 2009 || Kitt Peak || Spacewatch ||  || align=right | 2.8 km || 
|-id=149 bgcolor=#fefefe
| 599149 ||  || — || September 28, 2006 || Mount Lemmon || Mount Lemmon Survey ||  || align=right data-sort-value="0.58" | 580 m || 
|-id=150 bgcolor=#fefefe
| 599150 ||  || — || September 23, 2009 || Kitt Peak || Spacewatch ||  || align=right data-sort-value="0.87" | 870 m || 
|-id=151 bgcolor=#d6d6d6
| 599151 ||  || — || September 19, 2003 || Palomar || NEAT || Tj (2.97) || align=right | 3.7 km || 
|-id=152 bgcolor=#fefefe
| 599152 ||  || — || September 17, 2009 || Kitt Peak || Spacewatch ||  || align=right data-sort-value="0.60" | 600 m || 
|-id=153 bgcolor=#d6d6d6
| 599153 ||  || — || September 18, 2009 || Kitt Peak || Spacewatch ||  || align=right | 2.0 km || 
|-id=154 bgcolor=#d6d6d6
| 599154 ||  || — || September 16, 2009 || Mount Lemmon || Mount Lemmon Survey ||  || align=right | 2.9 km || 
|-id=155 bgcolor=#d6d6d6
| 599155 ||  || — || April 19, 2007 || Mount Lemmon || Mount Lemmon Survey ||  || align=right | 2.6 km || 
|-id=156 bgcolor=#fefefe
| 599156 ||  || — || August 31, 2017 || Mount Lemmon || Mount Lemmon Survey || H || align=right data-sort-value="0.51" | 510 m || 
|-id=157 bgcolor=#fefefe
| 599157 ||  || — || March 28, 2012 || Mount Lemmon || Mount Lemmon Survey ||  || align=right data-sort-value="0.64" | 640 m || 
|-id=158 bgcolor=#d6d6d6
| 599158 ||  || — || November 4, 2004 || Kitt Peak || Spacewatch ||  || align=right | 2.3 km || 
|-id=159 bgcolor=#d6d6d6
| 599159 ||  || — || January 24, 2011 || Mount Lemmon || Mount Lemmon Survey ||  || align=right | 2.5 km || 
|-id=160 bgcolor=#d6d6d6
| 599160 ||  || — || November 20, 2015 || Mount Lemmon || Mount Lemmon Survey ||  || align=right | 2.6 km || 
|-id=161 bgcolor=#fefefe
| 599161 ||  || — || September 27, 2009 || Kitt Peak || Spacewatch ||  || align=right data-sort-value="0.54" | 540 m || 
|-id=162 bgcolor=#d6d6d6
| 599162 ||  || — || June 30, 2014 || Haleakala || Pan-STARRS ||  || align=right | 2.8 km || 
|-id=163 bgcolor=#fefefe
| 599163 ||  || — || September 26, 2009 || Kitt Peak || Spacewatch ||  || align=right data-sort-value="0.66" | 660 m || 
|-id=164 bgcolor=#d6d6d6
| 599164 ||  || — || May 9, 2013 || Haleakala || Pan-STARRS ||  || align=right | 2.4 km || 
|-id=165 bgcolor=#fefefe
| 599165 ||  || — || October 5, 2013 || Haleakala || Pan-STARRS ||  || align=right data-sort-value="0.84" | 840 m || 
|-id=166 bgcolor=#C2FFFF
| 599166 ||  || — || September 29, 2009 || Mount Lemmon || Mount Lemmon Survey || L4 || align=right | 7.0 km || 
|-id=167 bgcolor=#C2FFFF
| 599167 ||  || — || July 30, 2008 || Mount Lemmon || Mount Lemmon Survey || L4 || align=right | 5.4 km || 
|-id=168 bgcolor=#d6d6d6
| 599168 ||  || — || August 30, 2014 || Mount Lemmon || Mount Lemmon Survey ||  || align=right | 2.2 km || 
|-id=169 bgcolor=#d6d6d6
| 599169 ||  || — || March 8, 2013 || Haleakala || Pan-STARRS ||  || align=right | 2.2 km || 
|-id=170 bgcolor=#d6d6d6
| 599170 ||  || — || June 24, 2014 || Haleakala || Pan-STARRS ||  || align=right | 2.3 km || 
|-id=171 bgcolor=#fefefe
| 599171 ||  || — || October 4, 2016 || Mount Lemmon || Mount Lemmon Survey ||  || align=right data-sort-value="0.53" | 530 m || 
|-id=172 bgcolor=#d6d6d6
| 599172 ||  || — || September 12, 2015 || Haleakala || Pan-STARRS ||  || align=right | 2.1 km || 
|-id=173 bgcolor=#C2FFFF
| 599173 ||  || — || September 29, 2009 || Mount Lemmon || Mount Lemmon Survey || L4 || align=right | 5.3 km || 
|-id=174 bgcolor=#d6d6d6
| 599174 ||  || — || June 29, 2014 || Haleakala || Pan-STARRS ||  || align=right | 2.4 km || 
|-id=175 bgcolor=#d6d6d6
| 599175 ||  || — || February 16, 2012 || Haleakala || Pan-STARRS ||  || align=right | 2.5 km || 
|-id=176 bgcolor=#C2FFFF
| 599176 ||  || — || September 24, 2009 || Mount Lemmon || Mount Lemmon Survey || L4 || align=right | 5.9 km || 
|-id=177 bgcolor=#fefefe
| 599177 ||  || — || September 30, 2009 || Mount Lemmon || Mount Lemmon Survey ||  || align=right data-sort-value="0.70" | 700 m || 
|-id=178 bgcolor=#C2FFFF
| 599178 ||  || — || September 29, 2009 || Mount Lemmon || Mount Lemmon Survey || L4 || align=right | 7.8 km || 
|-id=179 bgcolor=#C2FFFF
| 599179 ||  || — || September 28, 2009 || Mount Lemmon || Mount Lemmon Survey || L4 || align=right | 6.5 km || 
|-id=180 bgcolor=#C2FFFF
| 599180 ||  || — || September 17, 2009 || Mount Lemmon || Mount Lemmon Survey || L4 || align=right | 7.1 km || 
|-id=181 bgcolor=#E9E9E9
| 599181 ||  || — || September 29, 2009 || Kitt Peak || Spacewatch ||  || align=right | 1.2 km || 
|-id=182 bgcolor=#C2FFFF
| 599182 ||  || — || September 28, 2009 || Mount Lemmon || Mount Lemmon Survey || L4 || align=right | 6.4 km || 
|-id=183 bgcolor=#E9E9E9
| 599183 ||  || — || September 25, 2009 || Kitt Peak || Spacewatch ||  || align=right | 1.2 km || 
|-id=184 bgcolor=#C2FFFF
| 599184 ||  || — || September 27, 2009 || Kitt Peak || Spacewatch || L4 || align=right | 6.7 km || 
|-id=185 bgcolor=#C2FFFF
| 599185 ||  || — || September 22, 2009 || Kitt Peak || Spacewatch || L4 || align=right | 6.4 km || 
|-id=186 bgcolor=#C2FFFF
| 599186 ||  || — || September 28, 2009 || Mount Lemmon || Mount Lemmon Survey || L4 || align=right | 5.7 km || 
|-id=187 bgcolor=#C2FFFF
| 599187 ||  || — || September 19, 2009 || Kitt Peak || Spacewatch || L4 || align=right | 5.9 km || 
|-id=188 bgcolor=#C2FFFF
| 599188 ||  || — || September 29, 2009 || Mount Lemmon || Mount Lemmon Survey || L4 || align=right | 6.8 km || 
|-id=189 bgcolor=#d6d6d6
| 599189 ||  || — || September 16, 2009 || Kitt Peak || Spacewatch ||  || align=right | 1.7 km || 
|-id=190 bgcolor=#d6d6d6
| 599190 ||  || — || September 28, 2009 || Mount Lemmon || Mount Lemmon Survey ||  || align=right | 2.2 km || 
|-id=191 bgcolor=#C2FFFF
| 599191 ||  || — || September 25, 2009 || Kitt Peak || Spacewatch || L4 || align=right | 5.6 km || 
|-id=192 bgcolor=#fefefe
| 599192 ||  || — || October 6, 2009 || La Silla || A. Galád ||  || align=right | 1.1 km || 
|-id=193 bgcolor=#E9E9E9
| 599193 ||  || — || October 1, 2009 || Mount Lemmon || Mount Lemmon Survey ||  || align=right | 1.8 km || 
|-id=194 bgcolor=#FA8072
| 599194 ||  || — || May 8, 2005 || Kitt Peak || Spacewatch ||  || align=right data-sort-value="0.73" | 730 m || 
|-id=195 bgcolor=#C2FFFF
| 599195 ||  || — || October 11, 2009 || Mount Lemmon || Mount Lemmon Survey || L4 || align=right | 6.2 km || 
|-id=196 bgcolor=#fefefe
| 599196 ||  || — || October 14, 2009 || La Sagra || OAM Obs. ||  || align=right data-sort-value="0.81" | 810 m || 
|-id=197 bgcolor=#fefefe
| 599197 ||  || — || September 20, 2009 || Kitt Peak || Spacewatch ||  || align=right data-sort-value="0.83" | 830 m || 
|-id=198 bgcolor=#C2FFFF
| 599198 ||  || — || September 5, 2008 || Kitt Peak || Spacewatch || L4 || align=right | 7.2 km || 
|-id=199 bgcolor=#E9E9E9
| 599199 ||  || — || October 15, 2009 || Mount Lemmon || Mount Lemmon Survey ||  || align=right | 1.5 km || 
|-id=200 bgcolor=#d6d6d6
| 599200 ||  || — || September 25, 2009 || La Sagra || OAM Obs. ||  || align=right | 3.4 km || 
|}

599201–599300 

|-bgcolor=#d6d6d6
| 599201 ||  || — || September 18, 2003 || Kitt Peak || Spacewatch ||  || align=right | 3.0 km || 
|-id=202 bgcolor=#E9E9E9
| 599202 ||  || — || October 12, 2009 || Mount Lemmon || Mount Lemmon Survey ||  || align=right data-sort-value="0.79" | 790 m || 
|-id=203 bgcolor=#fefefe
| 599203 ||  || — || October 2, 2009 || Mount Lemmon || Mount Lemmon Survey ||  || align=right data-sort-value="0.86" | 860 m || 
|-id=204 bgcolor=#C2FFFF
| 599204 ||  || — || February 23, 2015 || Haleakala || Pan-STARRS || L4 || align=right | 7.3 km || 
|-id=205 bgcolor=#C2FFFF
| 599205 ||  || — || October 14, 2009 || Mount Lemmon || Mount Lemmon Survey || L4 || align=right | 5.5 km || 
|-id=206 bgcolor=#fefefe
| 599206 ||  || — || September 23, 2005 || Catalina || CSS ||  || align=right data-sort-value="0.77" | 770 m || 
|-id=207 bgcolor=#d6d6d6
| 599207 ||  || — || October 8, 2009 || La Sagra || OAM Obs. ||  || align=right | 2.0 km || 
|-id=208 bgcolor=#E9E9E9
| 599208 ||  || — || October 17, 2009 || Tzec Maun || V. Nevski ||  || align=right | 1.9 km || 
|-id=209 bgcolor=#d6d6d6
| 599209 ||  || — || October 18, 2009 || Hibiscus || N. Teamo ||  || align=right | 3.0 km || 
|-id=210 bgcolor=#d6d6d6
| 599210 ||  || — || September 16, 2009 || Catalina || CSS ||  || align=right | 2.9 km || 
|-id=211 bgcolor=#C2FFFF
| 599211 ||  || — || October 19, 2009 || Sierra Stars || W. G. Dillon || L4 || align=right | 6.1 km || 
|-id=212 bgcolor=#E9E9E9
| 599212 ||  || — || October 22, 2009 || Mount Lemmon || Mount Lemmon Survey ||  || align=right | 2.1 km || 
|-id=213 bgcolor=#E9E9E9
| 599213 ||  || — || October 25, 2005 || Mount Lemmon || Mount Lemmon Survey ||  || align=right data-sort-value="0.58" | 580 m || 
|-id=214 bgcolor=#fefefe
| 599214 ||  || — || September 15, 2009 || Kitt Peak || Spacewatch ||  || align=right data-sort-value="0.71" | 710 m || 
|-id=215 bgcolor=#d6d6d6
| 599215 ||  || — || September 22, 2009 || Mount Lemmon || Mount Lemmon Survey ||  || align=right | 2.6 km || 
|-id=216 bgcolor=#C2FFFF
| 599216 ||  || — || September 22, 2009 || Mount Lemmon || Mount Lemmon Survey || L4 || align=right | 7.5 km || 
|-id=217 bgcolor=#C2FFFF
| 599217 ||  || — || September 22, 2009 || Mount Lemmon || Mount Lemmon Survey || L4 || align=right | 7.4 km || 
|-id=218 bgcolor=#E9E9E9
| 599218 ||  || — || October 22, 2009 || Mount Lemmon || Mount Lemmon Survey ||  || align=right data-sort-value="0.76" | 760 m || 
|-id=219 bgcolor=#C2FFFF
| 599219 ||  || — || September 27, 2009 || Kitt Peak || Spacewatch || L4 || align=right | 6.8 km || 
|-id=220 bgcolor=#fefefe
| 599220 ||  || — || July 3, 2005 || Palomar || NEAT || NYS || align=right data-sort-value="0.64" | 640 m || 
|-id=221 bgcolor=#fefefe
| 599221 ||  || — || October 17, 2009 || Mount Lemmon || Mount Lemmon Survey ||  || align=right data-sort-value="0.72" | 720 m || 
|-id=222 bgcolor=#C2FFFF
| 599222 ||  || — || October 17, 2009 || Mount Lemmon || Mount Lemmon Survey || L4 || align=right | 6.9 km || 
|-id=223 bgcolor=#C2FFFF
| 599223 ||  || — || September 28, 2009 || Mount Lemmon || Mount Lemmon Survey || L4 || align=right | 6.7 km || 
|-id=224 bgcolor=#C2FFFF
| 599224 ||  || — || October 17, 2009 || Mount Lemmon || Mount Lemmon Survey || L4 || align=right | 5.4 km || 
|-id=225 bgcolor=#d6d6d6
| 599225 ||  || — || September 28, 2009 || Mount Lemmon || Mount Lemmon Survey ||  || align=right | 2.3 km || 
|-id=226 bgcolor=#d6d6d6
| 599226 ||  || — || October 23, 2009 || Mount Lemmon || Mount Lemmon Survey ||  || align=right | 3.1 km || 
|-id=227 bgcolor=#C2FFFF
| 599227 ||  || — || September 18, 2009 || Kitt Peak || Spacewatch || L4 || align=right | 8.9 km || 
|-id=228 bgcolor=#C2FFFF
| 599228 ||  || — || September 15, 2009 || Kitt Peak || Spacewatch || L4 || align=right | 9.7 km || 
|-id=229 bgcolor=#E9E9E9
| 599229 ||  || — || October 23, 2009 || Mount Lemmon || Mount Lemmon Survey ||  || align=right | 1.5 km || 
|-id=230 bgcolor=#fefefe
| 599230 ||  || — || October 23, 2009 || Mount Lemmon || Mount Lemmon Survey ||  || align=right data-sort-value="0.82" | 820 m || 
|-id=231 bgcolor=#E9E9E9
| 599231 ||  || — || February 24, 2006 || Catalina || CSS ||  || align=right | 2.1 km || 
|-id=232 bgcolor=#E9E9E9
| 599232 ||  || — || October 11, 2009 || Mount Lemmon || Mount Lemmon Survey ||  || align=right | 1.8 km || 
|-id=233 bgcolor=#d6d6d6
| 599233 ||  || — || October 21, 2009 || Mount Lemmon || Mount Lemmon Survey ||  || align=right | 2.2 km || 
|-id=234 bgcolor=#C2FFFF
| 599234 ||  || — || October 14, 2009 || Bergisch Gladbach || W. Bickel || L4 || align=right | 7.9 km || 
|-id=235 bgcolor=#d6d6d6
| 599235 ||  || — || September 27, 2009 || Kitt Peak || Spacewatch ||  || align=right | 1.6 km || 
|-id=236 bgcolor=#fefefe
| 599236 ||  || — || September 15, 2009 || Kitt Peak || Spacewatch ||  || align=right data-sort-value="0.98" | 980 m || 
|-id=237 bgcolor=#d6d6d6
| 599237 ||  || — || September 16, 2009 || Mount Lemmon || Mount Lemmon Survey ||  || align=right | 3.2 km || 
|-id=238 bgcolor=#E9E9E9
| 599238 ||  || — || October 26, 2009 || Mount Lemmon || Mount Lemmon Survey ||  || align=right data-sort-value="0.70" | 700 m || 
|-id=239 bgcolor=#E9E9E9
| 599239 ||  || — || October 25, 2005 || Mount Lemmon || Mount Lemmon Survey ||  || align=right | 1.1 km || 
|-id=240 bgcolor=#d6d6d6
| 599240 ||  || — || October 26, 2009 || Mount Lemmon || Mount Lemmon Survey ||  || align=right | 2.1 km || 
|-id=241 bgcolor=#C2FFFF
| 599241 ||  || — || October 26, 2009 || Mount Lemmon || Mount Lemmon Survey || L4 || align=right | 9.6 km || 
|-id=242 bgcolor=#C2FFFF
| 599242 ||  || — || September 21, 2009 || Kitt Peak || Spacewatch || L4 || align=right | 6.6 km || 
|-id=243 bgcolor=#C2FFFF
| 599243 ||  || — || October 19, 2010 || Mount Lemmon || Mount Lemmon Survey || L4 || align=right | 7.7 km || 
|-id=244 bgcolor=#d6d6d6
| 599244 ||  || — || November 21, 2015 || Mount Lemmon || Mount Lemmon Survey ||  || align=right | 2.5 km || 
|-id=245 bgcolor=#E9E9E9
| 599245 ||  || — || January 17, 2015 || Mount Lemmon || Mount Lemmon Survey ||  || align=right data-sort-value="0.94" | 940 m || 
|-id=246 bgcolor=#E9E9E9
| 599246 ||  || — || October 18, 2009 || Mount Lemmon || Mount Lemmon Survey ||  || align=right data-sort-value="0.72" | 720 m || 
|-id=247 bgcolor=#fefefe
| 599247 ||  || — || December 31, 2013 || Haleakala || Pan-STARRS ||  || align=right data-sort-value="0.73" | 730 m || 
|-id=248 bgcolor=#d6d6d6
| 599248 ||  || — || September 22, 2014 || Haleakala || Pan-STARRS ||  || align=right | 2.4 km || 
|-id=249 bgcolor=#d6d6d6
| 599249 ||  || — || September 9, 2015 || Haleakala || Pan-STARRS ||  || align=right | 2.3 km || 
|-id=250 bgcolor=#C2FFFF
| 599250 ||  || — || November 18, 2011 || Mount Lemmon || Mount Lemmon Survey || L4 || align=right | 8.9 km || 
|-id=251 bgcolor=#d6d6d6
| 599251 ||  || — || January 23, 2011 || Mount Lemmon || Mount Lemmon Survey ||  || align=right | 2.7 km || 
|-id=252 bgcolor=#d6d6d6
| 599252 ||  || — || April 10, 2013 || Haleakala || Pan-STARRS ||  || align=right | 2.2 km || 
|-id=253 bgcolor=#d6d6d6
| 599253 ||  || — || January 14, 2018 || Haleakala || Pan-STARRS ||  || align=right | 2.9 km || 
|-id=254 bgcolor=#C2FFFF
| 599254 ||  || — || January 18, 2013 || Mount Lemmon || Mount Lemmon Survey || L4 || align=right | 6.3 km || 
|-id=255 bgcolor=#C2FFFF
| 599255 ||  || — || October 27, 2009 || Mount Lemmon || Mount Lemmon Survey || L4 || align=right | 6.6 km || 
|-id=256 bgcolor=#C2FFFF
| 599256 ||  || — || October 16, 2009 || Mount Lemmon || Mount Lemmon Survey || L4 || align=right | 6.9 km || 
|-id=257 bgcolor=#C2FFFF
| 599257 ||  || — || June 11, 2007 || Mauna Kea || Mauna Kea Obs. || L4 || align=right | 6.9 km || 
|-id=258 bgcolor=#C2FFFF
| 599258 ||  || — || October 26, 2009 || Mount Lemmon || Mount Lemmon Survey || L4 || align=right | 6.5 km || 
|-id=259 bgcolor=#C2FFFF
| 599259 ||  || — || October 25, 2009 || Kitt Peak || Spacewatch || L4 || align=right | 6.9 km || 
|-id=260 bgcolor=#d6d6d6
| 599260 ||  || — || March 16, 2013 || Kitt Peak || Spacewatch ||  || align=right | 2.1 km || 
|-id=261 bgcolor=#C2FFFF
| 599261 ||  || — || June 15, 2018 || Haleakala || Pan-STARRS || L4 || align=right | 7.2 km || 
|-id=262 bgcolor=#fefefe
| 599262 ||  || — || August 3, 2016 || Haleakala || Pan-STARRS ||  || align=right data-sort-value="0.50" | 500 m || 
|-id=263 bgcolor=#C2FFFF
| 599263 ||  || — || October 26, 2009 || Kitt Peak || Spacewatch || L4 || align=right | 7.9 km || 
|-id=264 bgcolor=#d6d6d6
| 599264 ||  || — || October 27, 2009 || Mount Lemmon || Mount Lemmon Survey ||  || align=right | 2.3 km || 
|-id=265 bgcolor=#E9E9E9
| 599265 ||  || — || October 23, 2009 || Mount Lemmon || Mount Lemmon Survey ||  || align=right data-sort-value="0.62" | 620 m || 
|-id=266 bgcolor=#fefefe
| 599266 ||  || — || October 24, 2009 || Kitt Peak || Spacewatch ||  || align=right data-sort-value="0.62" | 620 m || 
|-id=267 bgcolor=#C2FFFF
| 599267 ||  || — || October 16, 2009 || Mount Lemmon || Mount Lemmon Survey || L4 || align=right | 6.1 km || 
|-id=268 bgcolor=#C2FFFF
| 599268 ||  || — || October 27, 2009 || Mount Lemmon || Mount Lemmon Survey || L4 || align=right | 6.5 km || 
|-id=269 bgcolor=#C2FFFF
| 599269 ||  || — || October 24, 2009 || Kitt Peak || Spacewatch || L4 || align=right | 8.4 km || 
|-id=270 bgcolor=#C2FFFF
| 599270 ||  || — || October 16, 2009 || Mount Lemmon || Mount Lemmon Survey || L4 || align=right | 7.2 km || 
|-id=271 bgcolor=#fefefe
| 599271 ||  || — || October 16, 2009 || Mount Lemmon || Mount Lemmon Survey ||  || align=right data-sort-value="0.51" | 510 m || 
|-id=272 bgcolor=#E9E9E9
| 599272 ||  || — || October 18, 2009 || Mount Lemmon || Mount Lemmon Survey ||  || align=right | 1.5 km || 
|-id=273 bgcolor=#fefefe
| 599273 ||  || — || October 17, 2009 || Mount Lemmon || Mount Lemmon Survey || H || align=right data-sort-value="0.53" | 530 m || 
|-id=274 bgcolor=#d6d6d6
| 599274 ||  || — || November 8, 2009 || Mount Lemmon || Mount Lemmon Survey ||  || align=right | 3.0 km || 
|-id=275 bgcolor=#d6d6d6
| 599275 ||  || — || November 8, 2009 || Mount Lemmon || Mount Lemmon Survey ||  || align=right | 2.7 km || 
|-id=276 bgcolor=#C2FFFF
| 599276 ||  || — || November 9, 2009 || Mount Lemmon || Mount Lemmon Survey || L4 || align=right | 5.7 km || 
|-id=277 bgcolor=#C2FFFF
| 599277 ||  || — || October 8, 2008 || Mount Lemmon || Mount Lemmon Survey || L4 || align=right | 7.5 km || 
|-id=278 bgcolor=#d6d6d6
| 599278 ||  || — || November 9, 2009 || Catalina || CSS ||  || align=right | 2.5 km || 
|-id=279 bgcolor=#fefefe
| 599279 ||  || — || August 25, 2005 || Palomar || NEAT ||  || align=right data-sort-value="0.73" | 730 m || 
|-id=280 bgcolor=#E9E9E9
| 599280 ||  || — || October 26, 2009 || Kitt Peak || Spacewatch ||  || align=right | 1.2 km || 
|-id=281 bgcolor=#C2FFFF
| 599281 ||  || — || September 29, 2008 || Mount Lemmon || Mount Lemmon Survey || L4 || align=right | 6.6 km || 
|-id=282 bgcolor=#E9E9E9
| 599282 ||  || — || February 7, 2002 || La Silla ||  ||  || align=right | 1.7 km || 
|-id=283 bgcolor=#C2FFFF
| 599283 ||  || — || September 5, 2008 || Kitt Peak || Spacewatch || L4 || align=right | 6.2 km || 
|-id=284 bgcolor=#d6d6d6
| 599284 ||  || — || November 9, 2009 || Kitt Peak || Spacewatch ||  || align=right | 2.9 km || 
|-id=285 bgcolor=#E9E9E9
| 599285 ||  || — || November 9, 2009 || Mount Lemmon || Mount Lemmon Survey ||  || align=right | 1.1 km || 
|-id=286 bgcolor=#C2FFFF
| 599286 ||  || — || September 27, 2009 || Kitt Peak || Spacewatch || L4 || align=right | 6.9 km || 
|-id=287 bgcolor=#d6d6d6
| 599287 ||  || — || November 11, 2009 || Kitt Peak || Spacewatch ||  || align=right | 2.4 km || 
|-id=288 bgcolor=#E9E9E9
| 599288 ||  || — || November 11, 2009 || Kitt Peak || Spacewatch ||  || align=right | 1.9 km || 
|-id=289 bgcolor=#d6d6d6
| 599289 ||  || — || November 9, 2009 || Kitt Peak || Spacewatch ||  || align=right | 2.2 km || 
|-id=290 bgcolor=#d6d6d6
| 599290 ||  || — || November 9, 2009 || Mount Lemmon || Mount Lemmon Survey ||  || align=right | 4.1 km || 
|-id=291 bgcolor=#fefefe
| 599291 ||  || — || November 9, 2009 || Mount Lemmon || Mount Lemmon Survey ||  || align=right data-sort-value="0.86" | 860 m || 
|-id=292 bgcolor=#fefefe
| 599292 ||  || — || February 3, 2000 || Kitt Peak || Spacewatch ||  || align=right | 1.1 km || 
|-id=293 bgcolor=#fefefe
| 599293 ||  || — || March 29, 2015 || Haleakala || Pan-STARRS ||  || align=right data-sort-value="0.71" | 710 m || 
|-id=294 bgcolor=#C2FFFF
| 599294 ||  || — || February 16, 2013 || Mount Lemmon || Mount Lemmon Survey || L4 || align=right | 6.2 km || 
|-id=295 bgcolor=#d6d6d6
| 599295 ||  || — || November 8, 2009 || Kitt Peak || Spacewatch ||  || align=right | 3.3 km || 
|-id=296 bgcolor=#C2FFFF
| 599296 ||  || — || November 8, 2009 || Mount Lemmon || Mount Lemmon Survey || L4 || align=right | 6.1 km || 
|-id=297 bgcolor=#C2FFFF
| 599297 ||  || — || November 8, 2009 || Mount Lemmon || Mount Lemmon Survey || L4 || align=right | 7.0 km || 
|-id=298 bgcolor=#E9E9E9
| 599298 ||  || — || November 11, 2009 || Kitt Peak || Spacewatch ||  || align=right | 1.7 km || 
|-id=299 bgcolor=#d6d6d6
| 599299 ||  || — || November 11, 2009 || Mount Lemmon || Mount Lemmon Survey ||  || align=right | 2.6 km || 
|-id=300 bgcolor=#fefefe
| 599300 ||  || — || April 6, 2008 || Mount Lemmon || Mount Lemmon Survey ||  || align=right data-sort-value="0.82" | 820 m || 
|}

599301–599400 

|-bgcolor=#E9E9E9
| 599301 ||  || — || November 17, 2009 || Mount Lemmon || Mount Lemmon Survey ||  || align=right data-sort-value="0.67" | 670 m || 
|-id=302 bgcolor=#d6d6d6
| 599302 ||  || — || October 11, 2009 || Mount Lemmon || Mount Lemmon Survey ||  || align=right | 1.9 km || 
|-id=303 bgcolor=#E9E9E9
| 599303 ||  || — || November 18, 2009 || Kitt Peak || Spacewatch ||  || align=right | 1.1 km || 
|-id=304 bgcolor=#E9E9E9
| 599304 ||  || — || September 19, 2009 || Mount Lemmon || Mount Lemmon Survey ||  || align=right | 1.6 km || 
|-id=305 bgcolor=#fefefe
| 599305 ||  || — || October 14, 2009 || Mount Lemmon || Mount Lemmon Survey ||  || align=right data-sort-value="0.63" | 630 m || 
|-id=306 bgcolor=#d6d6d6
| 599306 ||  || — || November 18, 2009 || Kitt Peak || Spacewatch ||  || align=right | 1.6 km || 
|-id=307 bgcolor=#d6d6d6
| 599307 ||  || — || October 23, 2009 || Mount Lemmon || Mount Lemmon Survey ||  || align=right | 1.8 km || 
|-id=308 bgcolor=#d6d6d6
| 599308 ||  || — || November 16, 2009 || Mount Lemmon || Mount Lemmon Survey ||  || align=right | 2.2 km || 
|-id=309 bgcolor=#E9E9E9
| 599309 ||  || — || October 25, 2009 || Kitt Peak || Spacewatch ||  || align=right data-sort-value="0.95" | 950 m || 
|-id=310 bgcolor=#d6d6d6
| 599310 ||  || — || September 19, 2014 || Haleakala || Pan-STARRS ||  || align=right | 2.2 km || 
|-id=311 bgcolor=#E9E9E9
| 599311 ||  || — || November 4, 2005 || Kitt Peak || Spacewatch ||  || align=right data-sort-value="0.79" | 790 m || 
|-id=312 bgcolor=#d6d6d6
| 599312 ||  || — || November 18, 2009 || Kitt Peak || Spacewatch || 7:4 || align=right | 2.6 km || 
|-id=313 bgcolor=#E9E9E9
| 599313 ||  || — || November 19, 2009 || Mount Lemmon || Mount Lemmon Survey ||  || align=right data-sort-value="0.77" | 770 m || 
|-id=314 bgcolor=#C2FFFF
| 599314 ||  || — || November 17, 2009 || Mount Lemmon || Mount Lemmon Survey || L4 || align=right | 7.1 km || 
|-id=315 bgcolor=#E9E9E9
| 599315 ||  || — || November 18, 2009 || Mount Lemmon || Mount Lemmon Survey ||  || align=right data-sort-value="0.89" | 890 m || 
|-id=316 bgcolor=#d6d6d6
| 599316 ||  || — || October 22, 2009 || Mount Lemmon || Mount Lemmon Survey ||  || align=right | 2.2 km || 
|-id=317 bgcolor=#E9E9E9
| 599317 ||  || — || November 20, 2009 || Kitt Peak || Spacewatch ||  || align=right data-sort-value="0.67" | 670 m || 
|-id=318 bgcolor=#E9E9E9
| 599318 ||  || — || June 11, 2004 || Kitt Peak || Spacewatch ||  || align=right data-sort-value="0.89" | 890 m || 
|-id=319 bgcolor=#fefefe
| 599319 ||  || — || October 25, 2009 || Kitt Peak || Spacewatch ||  || align=right data-sort-value="0.49" | 490 m || 
|-id=320 bgcolor=#E9E9E9
| 599320 ||  || — || September 18, 2009 || Kitt Peak || Spacewatch ||  || align=right | 1.7 km || 
|-id=321 bgcolor=#fefefe
| 599321 ||  || — || October 14, 2009 || Mount Lemmon || Mount Lemmon Survey ||  || align=right data-sort-value="0.86" | 860 m || 
|-id=322 bgcolor=#C2FFFF
| 599322 ||  || — || May 23, 2001 || Cerro Tololo || J. L. Elliot, L. H. Wasserman || L4 || align=right | 7.8 km || 
|-id=323 bgcolor=#d6d6d6
| 599323 ||  || — || November 19, 2009 || Mount Lemmon || Mount Lemmon Survey ||  || align=right | 1.8 km || 
|-id=324 bgcolor=#E9E9E9
| 599324 ||  || — || November 19, 2009 || Mount Lemmon || Mount Lemmon Survey ||  || align=right data-sort-value="0.78" | 780 m || 
|-id=325 bgcolor=#C2FFFF
| 599325 ||  || — || November 21, 2009 || Mount Lemmon || Mount Lemmon Survey || L4ERY || align=right | 6.0 km || 
|-id=326 bgcolor=#fefefe
| 599326 ||  || — || November 21, 2009 || La Sagra || OAM Obs. || H || align=right data-sort-value="0.78" | 780 m || 
|-id=327 bgcolor=#d6d6d6
| 599327 ||  || — || October 23, 2009 || Kitt Peak || Spacewatch ||  || align=right | 1.6 km || 
|-id=328 bgcolor=#E9E9E9
| 599328 ||  || — || November 22, 2009 || Kitt Peak || Spacewatch ||  || align=right data-sort-value="0.74" | 740 m || 
|-id=329 bgcolor=#d6d6d6
| 599329 ||  || — || November 23, 2009 || Kitt Peak || Spacewatch || EOS || align=right | 1.8 km || 
|-id=330 bgcolor=#E9E9E9
| 599330 ||  || — || December 6, 2005 || Kitt Peak || Spacewatch ||  || align=right data-sort-value="0.85" | 850 m || 
|-id=331 bgcolor=#fefefe
| 599331 ||  || — || November 12, 2005 || Kitt Peak || Spacewatch ||  || align=right data-sort-value="0.98" | 980 m || 
|-id=332 bgcolor=#E9E9E9
| 599332 ||  || — || November 24, 2009 || Kitt Peak || Spacewatch ||  || align=right data-sort-value="0.78" | 780 m || 
|-id=333 bgcolor=#fefefe
| 599333 ||  || — || August 26, 2005 || Palomar || NEAT ||  || align=right data-sort-value="0.72" | 720 m || 
|-id=334 bgcolor=#d6d6d6
| 599334 ||  || — || November 16, 2009 || Mount Lemmon || Mount Lemmon Survey || 7:4 || align=right | 2.4 km || 
|-id=335 bgcolor=#E9E9E9
| 599335 ||  || — || April 7, 2008 || Kitt Peak || Spacewatch ||  || align=right data-sort-value="0.72" | 720 m || 
|-id=336 bgcolor=#fefefe
| 599336 ||  || — || February 21, 2007 || Mount Lemmon || Mount Lemmon Survey ||  || align=right data-sort-value="0.92" | 920 m || 
|-id=337 bgcolor=#E9E9E9
| 599337 ||  || — || June 2, 2003 || Kitt Peak || Spacewatch ||  || align=right | 1.7 km || 
|-id=338 bgcolor=#d6d6d6
| 599338 ||  || — || November 18, 2009 || Kitt Peak || Spacewatch ||  || align=right | 3.2 km || 
|-id=339 bgcolor=#d6d6d6
| 599339 ||  || — || April 25, 2007 || Kitt Peak || Spacewatch ||  || align=right | 4.0 km || 
|-id=340 bgcolor=#E9E9E9
| 599340 ||  || — || November 18, 2009 || Kitt Peak || Spacewatch ||  || align=right | 1.7 km || 
|-id=341 bgcolor=#E9E9E9
| 599341 ||  || — || November 20, 2009 || Mount Lemmon || Mount Lemmon Survey ||  || align=right data-sort-value="0.68" | 680 m || 
|-id=342 bgcolor=#d6d6d6
| 599342 ||  || — || October 24, 2003 || Kitt Peak || Spacewatch ||  || align=right | 3.7 km || 
|-id=343 bgcolor=#fefefe
| 599343 ||  || — || November 16, 2009 || Mount Lemmon || Mount Lemmon Survey ||  || align=right data-sort-value="0.62" | 620 m || 
|-id=344 bgcolor=#C2FFFF
| 599344 ||  || — || June 5, 2016 || Haleakala || Pan-STARRS || L4 || align=right | 8.1 km || 
|-id=345 bgcolor=#E9E9E9
| 599345 ||  || — || May 15, 2012 || Haleakala || Pan-STARRS ||  || align=right data-sort-value="0.98" | 980 m || 
|-id=346 bgcolor=#E9E9E9
| 599346 ||  || — || May 3, 2011 || Kitt Peak || Spacewatch ||  || align=right | 2.0 km || 
|-id=347 bgcolor=#FA8072
| 599347 ||  || — || October 27, 2009 || Kitt Peak || Spacewatch ||  || align=right data-sort-value="0.83" | 830 m || 
|-id=348 bgcolor=#E9E9E9
| 599348 ||  || — || November 20, 2009 || Mount Lemmon || Mount Lemmon Survey ||  || align=right data-sort-value="0.79" | 790 m || 
|-id=349 bgcolor=#E9E9E9
| 599349 ||  || — || June 8, 2016 || Haleakala || Pan-STARRS ||  || align=right | 1.0 km || 
|-id=350 bgcolor=#E9E9E9
| 599350 ||  || — || March 6, 2011 || Mount Lemmon || Mount Lemmon Survey ||  || align=right | 2.2 km || 
|-id=351 bgcolor=#E9E9E9
| 599351 ||  || — || November 17, 2009 || Kitt Peak || Spacewatch ||  || align=right data-sort-value="0.82" | 820 m || 
|-id=352 bgcolor=#E9E9E9
| 599352 ||  || — || January 1, 2014 || Mount Lemmon || Mount Lemmon Survey ||  || align=right data-sort-value="0.94" | 940 m || 
|-id=353 bgcolor=#C2FFFF
| 599353 ||  || — || November 8, 2010 || Kitt Peak || Spacewatch || L4 || align=right | 7.4 km || 
|-id=354 bgcolor=#C2FFFF
| 599354 ||  || — || October 4, 1996 || Kitt Peak || Spacewatch || L4 || align=right | 7.5 km || 
|-id=355 bgcolor=#E9E9E9
| 599355 ||  || — || November 25, 2009 || Kitt Peak || Spacewatch ||  || align=right data-sort-value="0.68" | 680 m || 
|-id=356 bgcolor=#fefefe
| 599356 ||  || — || November 23, 2009 || Mount Lemmon || Mount Lemmon Survey ||  || align=right data-sort-value="0.76" | 760 m || 
|-id=357 bgcolor=#d6d6d6
| 599357 ||  || — || November 22, 2009 || Mount Lemmon || Mount Lemmon Survey ||  || align=right | 2.3 km || 
|-id=358 bgcolor=#E9E9E9
| 599358 ||  || — || November 23, 2009 || Mount Lemmon || Mount Lemmon Survey ||  || align=right | 2.7 km || 
|-id=359 bgcolor=#fefefe
| 599359 ||  || — || September 14, 2005 || Catalina || CSS ||  || align=right data-sort-value="0.70" | 700 m || 
|-id=360 bgcolor=#d6d6d6
| 599360 ||  || — || March 15, 2001 || Kitt Peak || Spacewatch ||  || align=right | 3.4 km || 
|-id=361 bgcolor=#E9E9E9
| 599361 ||  || — || November 16, 2009 || Mount Lemmon || Mount Lemmon Survey ||  || align=right data-sort-value="0.75" | 750 m || 
|-id=362 bgcolor=#E9E9E9
| 599362 ||  || — || October 15, 2009 || Mount Lemmon || Mount Lemmon Survey ||  || align=right | 1.4 km || 
|-id=363 bgcolor=#E9E9E9
| 599363 ||  || — || December 18, 2009 || Mount Lemmon || Mount Lemmon Survey ||  || align=right data-sort-value="0.79" | 790 m || 
|-id=364 bgcolor=#fefefe
| 599364 ||  || — || September 21, 2001 || Kitt Peak || Spacewatch ||  || align=right | 1.1 km || 
|-id=365 bgcolor=#E9E9E9
| 599365 ||  || — || December 19, 2009 || Mount Lemmon || Mount Lemmon Survey ||  || align=right data-sort-value="0.79" | 790 m || 
|-id=366 bgcolor=#E9E9E9
| 599366 ||  || — || December 18, 2009 || Mount Lemmon || Mount Lemmon Survey ||  || align=right | 1.9 km || 
|-id=367 bgcolor=#E9E9E9
| 599367 ||  || — || November 28, 2013 || Mount Lemmon || Mount Lemmon Survey ||  || align=right data-sort-value="0.95" | 950 m || 
|-id=368 bgcolor=#E9E9E9
| 599368 ||  || — || November 25, 2009 || Mount Lemmon || Mount Lemmon Survey ||  || align=right | 1.5 km || 
|-id=369 bgcolor=#E9E9E9
| 599369 ||  || — || August 2, 2016 || Haleakala || Pan-STARRS ||  || align=right data-sort-value="0.73" | 730 m || 
|-id=370 bgcolor=#fefefe
| 599370 ||  || — || December 19, 2009 || Kitt Peak || Spacewatch ||  || align=right data-sort-value="0.73" | 730 m || 
|-id=371 bgcolor=#E9E9E9
| 599371 ||  || — || December 16, 2009 || Mount Lemmon || Mount Lemmon Survey ||  || align=right | 1.5 km || 
|-id=372 bgcolor=#E9E9E9
| 599372 ||  || — || January 7, 2010 || Mount Lemmon || Mount Lemmon Survey ||  || align=right data-sort-value="0.76" | 760 m || 
|-id=373 bgcolor=#E9E9E9
| 599373 ||  || — || January 8, 2010 || Kitt Peak || Spacewatch ||  || align=right | 1.1 km || 
|-id=374 bgcolor=#E9E9E9
| 599374 ||  || — || January 7, 2006 || Mount Lemmon || Mount Lemmon Survey ||  || align=right data-sort-value="0.72" | 720 m || 
|-id=375 bgcolor=#E9E9E9
| 599375 ||  || — || February 6, 2006 || Kitt Peak || Spacewatch ||  || align=right data-sort-value="0.91" | 910 m || 
|-id=376 bgcolor=#E9E9E9
| 599376 ||  || — || January 10, 2010 || Mount Lemmon || Mount Lemmon Survey ||  || align=right | 1.5 km || 
|-id=377 bgcolor=#E9E9E9
| 599377 ||  || — || December 15, 2009 || Mount Lemmon || Mount Lemmon Survey ||  || align=right data-sort-value="0.98" | 980 m || 
|-id=378 bgcolor=#E9E9E9
| 599378 ||  || — || January 11, 2010 || Kitt Peak || Spacewatch ||  || align=right | 1.3 km || 
|-id=379 bgcolor=#fefefe
| 599379 ||  || — || January 14, 2010 || Kachina || J. Hobart || H || align=right data-sort-value="0.88" | 880 m || 
|-id=380 bgcolor=#E9E9E9
| 599380 ||  || — || January 22, 2002 || Kitt Peak || Spacewatch ||  || align=right data-sort-value="0.82" | 820 m || 
|-id=381 bgcolor=#fefefe
| 599381 ||  || — || January 8, 2010 || Mount Lemmon || Mount Lemmon Survey ||  || align=right data-sort-value="0.59" | 590 m || 
|-id=382 bgcolor=#E9E9E9
| 599382 ||  || — || July 7, 2003 || Kitt Peak || Spacewatch || HNS || align=right | 1.2 km || 
|-id=383 bgcolor=#E9E9E9
| 599383 ||  || — || January 7, 2010 || Mount Lemmon || Mount Lemmon Survey ||  || align=right data-sort-value="0.75" | 750 m || 
|-id=384 bgcolor=#d6d6d6
| 599384 ||  || — || November 15, 2010 || Mount Lemmon || Mount Lemmon Survey ||  || align=right | 3.9 km || 
|-id=385 bgcolor=#fefefe
| 599385 ||  || — || September 29, 2009 || Mount Lemmon || Mount Lemmon Survey ||  || align=right data-sort-value="0.79" | 790 m || 
|-id=386 bgcolor=#E9E9E9
| 599386 ||  || — || April 28, 2011 || Mount Lemmon || Mount Lemmon Survey ||  || align=right | 1.3 km || 
|-id=387 bgcolor=#d6d6d6
| 599387 ||  || — || July 13, 2013 || Haleakala || Pan-STARRS || 7:4 || align=right | 3.2 km || 
|-id=388 bgcolor=#E9E9E9
| 599388 ||  || — || November 10, 2013 || Mount Lemmon || Mount Lemmon Survey ||  || align=right | 2.0 km || 
|-id=389 bgcolor=#E9E9E9
| 599389 ||  || — || November 9, 2013 || Haleakala || Pan-STARRS ||  || align=right | 1.1 km || 
|-id=390 bgcolor=#E9E9E9
| 599390 ||  || — || January 7, 2010 || Kitt Peak || Spacewatch ||  || align=right | 1.1 km || 
|-id=391 bgcolor=#C2FFFF
| 599391 ||  || — || September 9, 2008 || Mount Lemmon || Mount Lemmon Survey || L4 || align=right | 7.2 km || 
|-id=392 bgcolor=#E9E9E9
| 599392 ||  || — || April 17, 2010 || Mount Lemmon || Mount Lemmon Survey ||  || align=right | 2.1 km || 
|-id=393 bgcolor=#E9E9E9
| 599393 ||  || — || December 31, 2013 || Haleakala || Pan-STARRS ||  || align=right | 1.3 km || 
|-id=394 bgcolor=#FA8072
| 599394 ||  || — || February 9, 2010 || Kitt Peak || Spacewatch || H || align=right data-sort-value="0.55" | 550 m || 
|-id=395 bgcolor=#E9E9E9
| 599395 ||  || — || January 11, 2010 || Kitt Peak || Spacewatch ||  || align=right | 1.4 km || 
|-id=396 bgcolor=#E9E9E9
| 599396 ||  || — || September 26, 2008 || Kitt Peak || Spacewatch ||  || align=right | 2.2 km || 
|-id=397 bgcolor=#E9E9E9
| 599397 ||  || — || February 13, 2010 || Kitt Peak || Spacewatch ||  || align=right | 1.3 km || 
|-id=398 bgcolor=#E9E9E9
| 599398 ||  || — || December 27, 2009 || Kitt Peak || Spacewatch ||  || align=right | 1.5 km || 
|-id=399 bgcolor=#E9E9E9
| 599399 ||  || — || January 8, 2010 || Mount Lemmon || Mount Lemmon Survey ||  || align=right | 1.2 km || 
|-id=400 bgcolor=#E9E9E9
| 599400 ||  || — || February 14, 2010 || Kitt Peak || Spacewatch ||  || align=right | 1.5 km || 
|}

599401–599500 

|-bgcolor=#E9E9E9
| 599401 ||  || — || February 14, 2010 || Kitt Peak || Spacewatch ||  || align=right | 1.3 km || 
|-id=402 bgcolor=#E9E9E9
| 599402 ||  || — || May 2, 2006 || Mount Lemmon || Mount Lemmon Survey ||  || align=right | 1.7 km || 
|-id=403 bgcolor=#E9E9E9
| 599403 ||  || — || January 26, 2001 || Kitt Peak || Spacewatch ||  || align=right | 1.7 km || 
|-id=404 bgcolor=#E9E9E9
| 599404 ||  || — || February 14, 2010 || Mount Lemmon || Mount Lemmon Survey ||  || align=right | 1.4 km || 
|-id=405 bgcolor=#E9E9E9
| 599405 ||  || — || September 5, 2008 || Kitt Peak || Spacewatch ||  || align=right | 1.3 km || 
|-id=406 bgcolor=#E9E9E9
| 599406 ||  || — || February 25, 2006 || Kitt Peak || Spacewatch ||  || align=right data-sort-value="0.97" | 970 m || 
|-id=407 bgcolor=#E9E9E9
| 599407 ||  || — || January 10, 2010 || Kitt Peak || Spacewatch ||  || align=right | 1.6 km || 
|-id=408 bgcolor=#E9E9E9
| 599408 ||  || — || January 8, 2010 || Kitt Peak || Spacewatch ||  || align=right | 1.6 km || 
|-id=409 bgcolor=#E9E9E9
| 599409 ||  || — || February 15, 2010 || Mount Lemmon || Mount Lemmon Survey ||  || align=right | 1.0 km || 
|-id=410 bgcolor=#E9E9E9
| 599410 ||  || — || February 15, 2010 || Mount Lemmon || Mount Lemmon Survey ||  || align=right | 1.00 km || 
|-id=411 bgcolor=#E9E9E9
| 599411 ||  || — || February 15, 2010 || Kitt Peak || Spacewatch ||  || align=right | 1.7 km || 
|-id=412 bgcolor=#E9E9E9
| 599412 ||  || — || February 9, 2010 || Kitt Peak || Spacewatch ||  || align=right | 2.1 km || 
|-id=413 bgcolor=#E9E9E9
| 599413 ||  || — || September 12, 2007 || Kitt Peak || Spacewatch ||  || align=right | 1.7 km || 
|-id=414 bgcolor=#fefefe
| 599414 ||  || — || July 11, 2016 || Haleakala || Pan-STARRS ||  || align=right data-sort-value="0.88" | 880 m || 
|-id=415 bgcolor=#d6d6d6
| 599415 ||  || — || May 21, 2012 || Mount Lemmon || Mount Lemmon Survey ||  || align=right | 2.6 km || 
|-id=416 bgcolor=#d6d6d6
| 599416 ||  || — || August 15, 2013 || Haleakala || Pan-STARRS ||  || align=right | 2.8 km || 
|-id=417 bgcolor=#E9E9E9
| 599417 ||  || — || February 5, 2014 || Catalina || CSS ||  || align=right data-sort-value="0.95" | 950 m || 
|-id=418 bgcolor=#E9E9E9
| 599418 ||  || — || December 13, 2013 || Mount Lemmon || Mount Lemmon Survey ||  || align=right | 1.2 km || 
|-id=419 bgcolor=#E9E9E9
| 599419 ||  || — || May 21, 2015 || Haleakala || Pan-STARRS ||  || align=right | 1.1 km || 
|-id=420 bgcolor=#E9E9E9
| 599420 ||  || — || February 16, 2010 || Needville || Needville Obs. ||  || align=right | 2.2 km || 
|-id=421 bgcolor=#fefefe
| 599421 ||  || — || February 17, 2010 || Kitt Peak || Spacewatch ||  || align=right data-sort-value="0.61" | 610 m || 
|-id=422 bgcolor=#d6d6d6
| 599422 ||  || — || February 16, 2010 || Mount Lemmon || Mount Lemmon Survey ||  || align=right | 1.9 km || 
|-id=423 bgcolor=#E9E9E9
| 599423 ||  || — || November 10, 2009 || Kitt Peak || Spacewatch ||  || align=right | 1.9 km || 
|-id=424 bgcolor=#E9E9E9
| 599424 ||  || — || September 21, 2012 || Mount Lemmon || Mount Lemmon Survey ||  || align=right data-sort-value="0.94" | 940 m || 
|-id=425 bgcolor=#E9E9E9
| 599425 ||  || — || February 17, 2010 || Kitt Peak || Spacewatch ||  || align=right | 1.2 km || 
|-id=426 bgcolor=#E9E9E9
| 599426 ||  || — || February 17, 2010 || Kitt Peak || Spacewatch ||  || align=right data-sort-value="0.96" | 960 m || 
|-id=427 bgcolor=#E9E9E9
| 599427 ||  || — || March 4, 2010 || Kitt Peak || Spacewatch ||  || align=right | 2.1 km || 
|-id=428 bgcolor=#E9E9E9
| 599428 ||  || — || April 2, 2006 || Kitt Peak || Spacewatch ||  || align=right | 1.8 km || 
|-id=429 bgcolor=#E9E9E9
| 599429 ||  || — || April 26, 2006 || Kitt Peak || Spacewatch ||  || align=right | 1.9 km || 
|-id=430 bgcolor=#E9E9E9
| 599430 ||  || — || February 17, 2010 || Kitt Peak || Spacewatch ||  || align=right | 1.2 km || 
|-id=431 bgcolor=#E9E9E9
| 599431 ||  || — || March 14, 2010 || Mount Lemmon || Mount Lemmon Survey ||  || align=right | 1.5 km || 
|-id=432 bgcolor=#E9E9E9
| 599432 ||  || — || March 12, 2010 || Kitt Peak || Spacewatch ||  || align=right | 1.7 km || 
|-id=433 bgcolor=#E9E9E9
| 599433 ||  || — || October 23, 2003 || Apache Point || SDSS Collaboration ||  || align=right | 2.1 km || 
|-id=434 bgcolor=#E9E9E9
| 599434 ||  || — || March 12, 2010 || Kitt Peak || Spacewatch ||  || align=right | 1.2 km || 
|-id=435 bgcolor=#E9E9E9
| 599435 ||  || — || March 12, 2010 || Kitt Peak || Spacewatch ||  || align=right | 1.5 km || 
|-id=436 bgcolor=#d6d6d6
| 599436 ||  || — || March 4, 2005 || Mount Lemmon || Mount Lemmon Survey ||  || align=right | 2.3 km || 
|-id=437 bgcolor=#E9E9E9
| 599437 ||  || — || January 12, 2010 || Kitt Peak || Spacewatch ||  || align=right | 1.1 km || 
|-id=438 bgcolor=#fefefe
| 599438 ||  || — || April 7, 2007 || Mount Lemmon || Mount Lemmon Survey ||  || align=right data-sort-value="0.52" | 520 m || 
|-id=439 bgcolor=#d6d6d6
| 599439 ||  || — || March 14, 2010 || Mount Lemmon || Mount Lemmon Survey ||  || align=right | 2.0 km || 
|-id=440 bgcolor=#E9E9E9
| 599440 ||  || — || March 14, 2010 || Mount Lemmon || Mount Lemmon Survey ||  || align=right | 1.1 km || 
|-id=441 bgcolor=#d6d6d6
| 599441 ||  || — || March 14, 2010 || Mount Lemmon || Mount Lemmon Survey ||  || align=right | 1.7 km || 
|-id=442 bgcolor=#d6d6d6
| 599442 ||  || — || March 14, 2010 || Mount Lemmon || Mount Lemmon Survey ||  || align=right | 1.9 km || 
|-id=443 bgcolor=#E9E9E9
| 599443 ||  || — || March 13, 2010 || Kitt Peak || Spacewatch ||  || align=right | 1.6 km || 
|-id=444 bgcolor=#fefefe
| 599444 ||  || — || March 30, 2000 || Kitt Peak || Spacewatch ||  || align=right data-sort-value="0.50" | 500 m || 
|-id=445 bgcolor=#fefefe
| 599445 ||  || — || March 12, 2010 || Kitt Peak || Spacewatch ||  || align=right data-sort-value="0.48" | 480 m || 
|-id=446 bgcolor=#E9E9E9
| 599446 ||  || — || March 13, 2010 || Catalina || CSS ||  || align=right | 1.1 km || 
|-id=447 bgcolor=#fefefe
| 599447 ||  || — || March 12, 2010 || Mount Lemmon || Mount Lemmon Survey ||  || align=right data-sort-value="0.68" | 680 m || 
|-id=448 bgcolor=#E9E9E9
| 599448 ||  || — || February 19, 2010 || Mount Lemmon || Mount Lemmon Survey ||  || align=right | 1.9 km || 
|-id=449 bgcolor=#E9E9E9
| 599449 ||  || — || October 11, 2007 || Mount Lemmon || Mount Lemmon Survey || DOR || align=right | 2.1 km || 
|-id=450 bgcolor=#fefefe
| 599450 ||  || — || March 12, 2010 || Kitt Peak || Spacewatch ||  || align=right data-sort-value="0.51" | 510 m || 
|-id=451 bgcolor=#E9E9E9
| 599451 ||  || — || March 18, 2010 || Mount Lemmon || Mount Lemmon Survey ||  || align=right | 1.8 km || 
|-id=452 bgcolor=#fefefe
| 599452 ||  || — || March 18, 2010 || Mount Lemmon || Mount Lemmon Survey ||  || align=right data-sort-value="0.52" | 520 m || 
|-id=453 bgcolor=#fefefe
| 599453 ||  || — || November 19, 2008 || Mount Lemmon || Mount Lemmon Survey ||  || align=right data-sort-value="0.68" | 680 m || 
|-id=454 bgcolor=#E9E9E9
| 599454 ||  || — || October 21, 2003 || Kitt Peak || Spacewatch ||  || align=right | 1.4 km || 
|-id=455 bgcolor=#E9E9E9
| 599455 ||  || — || March 17, 2010 || Kitt Peak || Spacewatch ||  || align=right | 1.5 km || 
|-id=456 bgcolor=#E9E9E9
| 599456 ||  || — || March 20, 2010 || Kitt Peak || Spacewatch ||  || align=right | 1.9 km || 
|-id=457 bgcolor=#E9E9E9
| 599457 ||  || — || March 21, 2010 || Catalina || CSS ||  || align=right | 2.4 km || 
|-id=458 bgcolor=#E9E9E9
| 599458 ||  || — || February 2, 2009 || Kitt Peak || Spacewatch ||  || align=right | 2.1 km || 
|-id=459 bgcolor=#d6d6d6
| 599459 ||  || — || April 24, 2015 || Haleakala || Pan-STARRS ||  || align=right | 2.2 km || 
|-id=460 bgcolor=#E9E9E9
| 599460 ||  || — || February 11, 2014 || Mount Lemmon || Mount Lemmon Survey ||  || align=right data-sort-value="0.87" | 870 m || 
|-id=461 bgcolor=#E9E9E9
| 599461 ||  || — || August 29, 2011 || Andrushivka || Y. Ivaščenko, P. Kyrylenko ||  || align=right | 2.6 km || 
|-id=462 bgcolor=#E9E9E9
| 599462 ||  || — || March 18, 2010 || Kitt Peak || Spacewatch ||  || align=right | 1.7 km || 
|-id=463 bgcolor=#fefefe
| 599463 ||  || — || July 28, 2011 || Haleakala || Pan-STARRS ||  || align=right data-sort-value="0.61" | 610 m || 
|-id=464 bgcolor=#E9E9E9
| 599464 ||  || — || March 20, 2010 || Kitt Peak || Spacewatch ||  || align=right | 1.1 km || 
|-id=465 bgcolor=#fefefe
| 599465 ||  || — || March 18, 2010 || Mount Lemmon || Mount Lemmon Survey ||  || align=right data-sort-value="0.48" | 480 m || 
|-id=466 bgcolor=#d6d6d6
| 599466 ||  || — || March 18, 2010 || Mount Lemmon || Mount Lemmon Survey ||  || align=right | 1.8 km || 
|-id=467 bgcolor=#E9E9E9
| 599467 ||  || — || March 13, 2010 || Mount Lemmon || Mount Lemmon Survey ||  || align=right | 1.6 km || 
|-id=468 bgcolor=#E9E9E9
| 599468 ||  || — || April 9, 2010 || Nogales || M. Schwartz, L. Elenin || MAR || align=right data-sort-value="0.96" | 960 m || 
|-id=469 bgcolor=#fefefe
| 599469 ||  || — || April 4, 2002 || Palomar || NEAT || H || align=right data-sort-value="0.61" | 610 m || 
|-id=470 bgcolor=#E9E9E9
| 599470 ||  || — || March 19, 2010 || Kitt Peak || Spacewatch ||  || align=right | 1.3 km || 
|-id=471 bgcolor=#fefefe
| 599471 ||  || — || April 10, 2010 || Mount Lemmon || Mount Lemmon Survey ||  || align=right data-sort-value="0.56" | 560 m || 
|-id=472 bgcolor=#E9E9E9
| 599472 ||  || — || November 30, 2008 || Kitt Peak || Spacewatch ||  || align=right | 2.4 km || 
|-id=473 bgcolor=#E9E9E9
| 599473 ||  || — || April 4, 2010 || Kitt Peak || Spacewatch ||  || align=right | 1.3 km || 
|-id=474 bgcolor=#fefefe
| 599474 ||  || — || April 4, 2010 || Kitt Peak || Spacewatch ||  || align=right data-sort-value="0.69" | 690 m || 
|-id=475 bgcolor=#E9E9E9
| 599475 ||  || — || October 8, 2007 || Mount Lemmon || Mount Lemmon Survey ||  || align=right | 1.8 km || 
|-id=476 bgcolor=#E9E9E9
| 599476 ||  || — || April 8, 2010 || Kitt Peak || Spacewatch || EUN || align=right | 1.0 km || 
|-id=477 bgcolor=#d6d6d6
| 599477 ||  || — || October 9, 2007 || Kitt Peak || Spacewatch ||  || align=right | 2.4 km || 
|-id=478 bgcolor=#E9E9E9
| 599478 ||  || — || July 24, 2003 || Palomar || NEAT ||  || align=right | 1.1 km || 
|-id=479 bgcolor=#E9E9E9
| 599479 ||  || — || September 14, 2007 || Mount Lemmon || Mount Lemmon Survey ||  || align=right | 1.9 km || 
|-id=480 bgcolor=#E9E9E9
| 599480 ||  || — || April 21, 2006 || Kitt Peak || Spacewatch ||  || align=right data-sort-value="0.76" | 760 m || 
|-id=481 bgcolor=#E9E9E9
| 599481 ||  || — || April 11, 2010 || Kitt Peak || Spacewatch ||  || align=right | 1.6 km || 
|-id=482 bgcolor=#E9E9E9
| 599482 ||  || — || December 20, 2004 || Mount Lemmon || Mount Lemmon Survey ||  || align=right | 1.3 km || 
|-id=483 bgcolor=#E9E9E9
| 599483 ||  || — || January 1, 2009 || Kitt Peak || Spacewatch ||  || align=right | 2.5 km || 
|-id=484 bgcolor=#E9E9E9
| 599484 ||  || — || March 9, 2005 || Catalina || CSS ||  || align=right | 2.2 km || 
|-id=485 bgcolor=#E9E9E9
| 599485 ||  || — || April 12, 2010 || Mount Lemmon || Mount Lemmon Survey ||  || align=right | 1.3 km || 
|-id=486 bgcolor=#E9E9E9
| 599486 ||  || — || April 4, 2010 || Kitt Peak || Spacewatch ||  || align=right data-sort-value="0.81" | 810 m || 
|-id=487 bgcolor=#E9E9E9
| 599487 ||  || — || March 25, 2006 || Kitt Peak || Spacewatch ||  || align=right | 1.4 km || 
|-id=488 bgcolor=#E9E9E9
| 599488 ||  || — || April 9, 2010 || Mount Lemmon || Mount Lemmon Survey ||  || align=right | 1.9 km || 
|-id=489 bgcolor=#E9E9E9
| 599489 ||  || — || May 5, 2010 || Catalina || CSS ||  || align=right | 2.1 km || 
|-id=490 bgcolor=#E9E9E9
| 599490 ||  || — || November 24, 2017 || Haleakala || Pan-STARRS ||  || align=right data-sort-value="0.69" | 690 m || 
|-id=491 bgcolor=#fefefe
| 599491 ||  || — || January 21, 2013 || Mount Lemmon || Mount Lemmon Survey ||  || align=right data-sort-value="0.74" | 740 m || 
|-id=492 bgcolor=#E9E9E9
| 599492 ||  || — || October 21, 2012 || Haleakala || Pan-STARRS ||  || align=right | 1.7 km || 
|-id=493 bgcolor=#E9E9E9
| 599493 ||  || — || January 26, 2014 || Calar Alto-CASADO || S. Mottola, S. Hellmich ||  || align=right | 1.1 km || 
|-id=494 bgcolor=#E9E9E9
| 599494 ||  || — || January 10, 2014 || Mount Lemmon || Mount Lemmon Survey ||  || align=right | 2.2 km || 
|-id=495 bgcolor=#E9E9E9
| 599495 ||  || — || April 14, 2010 || Mount Lemmon || Mount Lemmon Survey ||  || align=right | 1.7 km || 
|-id=496 bgcolor=#d6d6d6
| 599496 ||  || — || April 10, 2010 || Kitt Peak || Spacewatch || 3:2 || align=right | 3.1 km || 
|-id=497 bgcolor=#E9E9E9
| 599497 ||  || — || April 16, 2010 || Bergisch Gladbach || W. Bickel ||  || align=right | 1.3 km || 
|-id=498 bgcolor=#E9E9E9
| 599498 ||  || — || April 20, 2010 || Kitt Peak || Spacewatch ||  || align=right | 1.9 km || 
|-id=499 bgcolor=#E9E9E9
| 599499 ||  || — || April 10, 2010 || Kitt Peak || Spacewatch ||  || align=right | 2.3 km || 
|-id=500 bgcolor=#E9E9E9
| 599500 ||  || — || December 27, 2016 || Mount Lemmon || Mount Lemmon Survey ||  || align=right | 1.5 km || 
|}

599501–599600 

|-bgcolor=#E9E9E9
| 599501 ||  || — || May 20, 2015 || Haleakala || Pan-STARRS ||  || align=right | 1.1 km || 
|-id=502 bgcolor=#E9E9E9
| 599502 ||  || — || July 2, 2011 || Mount Lemmon || Mount Lemmon Survey ||  || align=right | 1.5 km || 
|-id=503 bgcolor=#fefefe
| 599503 ||  || — || February 5, 2013 || Kitt Peak || Spacewatch ||  || align=right data-sort-value="0.52" | 520 m || 
|-id=504 bgcolor=#E9E9E9
| 599504 ||  || — || April 20, 2010 || Mount Lemmon || Mount Lemmon Survey ||  || align=right data-sort-value="0.85" | 850 m || 
|-id=505 bgcolor=#E9E9E9
| 599505 ||  || — || October 19, 2003 || Kitt Peak || Spacewatch ||  || align=right | 1.3 km || 
|-id=506 bgcolor=#fefefe
| 599506 ||  || — || May 3, 2010 || Kitt Peak || Spacewatch ||  || align=right data-sort-value="0.56" | 560 m || 
|-id=507 bgcolor=#E9E9E9
| 599507 ||  || — || May 5, 2010 || Mount Lemmon || Mount Lemmon Survey ||  || align=right | 1.8 km || 
|-id=508 bgcolor=#E9E9E9
| 599508 ||  || — || May 4, 2010 || Catalina || CSS ||  || align=right | 1.8 km || 
|-id=509 bgcolor=#E9E9E9
| 599509 ||  || — || April 10, 2010 || Mount Lemmon || Mount Lemmon Survey ||  || align=right | 1.7 km || 
|-id=510 bgcolor=#E9E9E9
| 599510 ||  || — || May 7, 2010 || Kitt Peak || Spacewatch ||  || align=right | 1.5 km || 
|-id=511 bgcolor=#E9E9E9
| 599511 ||  || — || April 15, 2010 || Kitt Peak || Spacewatch ||  || align=right | 2.2 km || 
|-id=512 bgcolor=#E9E9E9
| 599512 ||  || — || December 22, 2008 || Kitt Peak || Spacewatch ||  || align=right | 1.9 km || 
|-id=513 bgcolor=#E9E9E9
| 599513 ||  || — || October 18, 2007 || Kitt Peak || Spacewatch ||  || align=right | 1.4 km || 
|-id=514 bgcolor=#fefefe
| 599514 ||  || — || May 4, 2010 || Kitt Peak || Spacewatch ||  || align=right data-sort-value="0.60" | 600 m || 
|-id=515 bgcolor=#fefefe
| 599515 ||  || — || May 12, 2010 || Kitt Peak || Spacewatch ||  || align=right data-sort-value="0.49" | 490 m || 
|-id=516 bgcolor=#fefefe
| 599516 ||  || — || May 7, 2010 || Mount Lemmon || Mount Lemmon Survey ||  || align=right data-sort-value="0.57" | 570 m || 
|-id=517 bgcolor=#d6d6d6
| 599517 ||  || — || October 20, 2007 || Mount Lemmon || Mount Lemmon Survey ||  || align=right | 2.5 km || 
|-id=518 bgcolor=#E9E9E9
| 599518 ||  || — || May 8, 2010 || Mount Lemmon || Mount Lemmon Survey ||  || align=right | 1.8 km || 
|-id=519 bgcolor=#E9E9E9
| 599519 ||  || — || May 12, 2010 || Mount Lemmon || Mount Lemmon Survey ||  || align=right | 1.5 km || 
|-id=520 bgcolor=#E9E9E9
| 599520 ||  || — || February 8, 2000 || Kitt Peak || Spacewatch ||  || align=right | 1.7 km || 
|-id=521 bgcolor=#fefefe
| 599521 ||  || — || May 11, 2010 || Mount Lemmon || Mount Lemmon Survey ||  || align=right data-sort-value="0.61" | 610 m || 
|-id=522 bgcolor=#d6d6d6
| 599522 ||  || — || May 14, 2010 || Mount Lemmon || Mount Lemmon Survey ||  || align=right | 2.5 km || 
|-id=523 bgcolor=#d6d6d6
| 599523 ||  || — || April 8, 2010 || Mount Lemmon || Mount Lemmon Survey ||  || align=right | 2.1 km || 
|-id=524 bgcolor=#d6d6d6
| 599524 ||  || — || October 17, 2007 || Mount Lemmon || Mount Lemmon Survey ||  || align=right | 2.5 km || 
|-id=525 bgcolor=#fefefe
| 599525 ||  || — || November 30, 2008 || Kitt Peak || Spacewatch ||  || align=right data-sort-value="0.74" | 740 m || 
|-id=526 bgcolor=#E9E9E9
| 599526 ||  || — || October 19, 2007 || Catalina || CSS ||  || align=right | 2.1 km || 
|-id=527 bgcolor=#E9E9E9
| 599527 ||  || — || May 11, 2010 || Kitt Peak || Spacewatch ||  || align=right | 2.0 km || 
|-id=528 bgcolor=#E9E9E9
| 599528 ||  || — || May 22, 2015 || Haleakala || Pan-STARRS ||  || align=right | 1.7 km || 
|-id=529 bgcolor=#E9E9E9
| 599529 ||  || — || March 23, 2015 || Kitt Peak || Spacewatch ||  || align=right | 1.6 km || 
|-id=530 bgcolor=#d6d6d6
| 599530 ||  || — || January 27, 2015 || Haleakala || Pan-STARRS ||  || align=right | 2.3 km || 
|-id=531 bgcolor=#E9E9E9
| 599531 ||  || — || March 29, 2006 || Kitt Peak || Spacewatch ||  || align=right | 1.3 km || 
|-id=532 bgcolor=#fefefe
| 599532 ||  || — || November 15, 2014 || Mount Lemmon || Mount Lemmon Survey ||  || align=right data-sort-value="0.64" | 640 m || 
|-id=533 bgcolor=#fefefe
| 599533 ||  || — || November 28, 2011 || Kitt Peak || Spacewatch || H || align=right data-sort-value="0.57" | 570 m || 
|-id=534 bgcolor=#fefefe
| 599534 ||  || — || April 28, 2000 || Kitt Peak || Spacewatch ||  || align=right data-sort-value="0.71" | 710 m || 
|-id=535 bgcolor=#E9E9E9
| 599535 ||  || — || September 18, 2011 || Mount Lemmon || Mount Lemmon Survey ||  || align=right | 1.7 km || 
|-id=536 bgcolor=#E9E9E9
| 599536 ||  || — || January 21, 2014 || Mount Lemmon || Mount Lemmon Survey ||  || align=right | 1.7 km || 
|-id=537 bgcolor=#fefefe
| 599537 ||  || — || May 7, 2010 || Mount Lemmon || Mount Lemmon Survey ||  || align=right data-sort-value="0.58" | 580 m || 
|-id=538 bgcolor=#d6d6d6
| 599538 ||  || — || May 16, 2010 || Kitt Peak || Spacewatch ||  || align=right | 1.9 km || 
|-id=539 bgcolor=#E9E9E9
| 599539 ||  || — || May 19, 2010 || Mount Lemmon || Mount Lemmon Survey ||  || align=right | 1.7 km || 
|-id=540 bgcolor=#E9E9E9
| 599540 ||  || — || May 24, 2006 || Mount Lemmon || Mount Lemmon Survey ||  || align=right | 1.5 km || 
|-id=541 bgcolor=#C2FFFF
| 599541 ||  || — || March 2, 2016 || Haleakala || Pan-STARRS || L5 || align=right | 7.1 km || 
|-id=542 bgcolor=#d6d6d6
| 599542 ||  || — || January 15, 2018 || Haleakala || Pan-STARRS ||  || align=right | 1.5 km || 
|-id=543 bgcolor=#d6d6d6
| 599543 ||  || — || December 26, 2011 || Mount Lemmon || Mount Lemmon Survey ||  || align=right | 2.3 km || 
|-id=544 bgcolor=#d6d6d6
| 599544 ||  || — || May 23, 2014 || Haleakala || Pan-STARRS ||  || align=right | 2.1 km || 
|-id=545 bgcolor=#d6d6d6
| 599545 ||  || — || February 28, 2008 || Mount Lemmon || Mount Lemmon Survey ||  || align=right | 2.1 km || 
|-id=546 bgcolor=#E9E9E9
| 599546 ||  || — || May 4, 2005 || Mauna Kea || Mauna Kea Obs. ||  || align=right | 1.6 km || 
|-id=547 bgcolor=#fefefe
| 599547 ||  || — || September 23, 2011 || Haleakala || Pan-STARRS ||  || align=right data-sort-value="0.63" | 630 m || 
|-id=548 bgcolor=#E9E9E9
| 599548 ||  || — || May 21, 2010 || Mount Lemmon || Mount Lemmon Survey ||  || align=right | 1.00 km || 
|-id=549 bgcolor=#d6d6d6
| 599549 ||  || — || January 24, 2014 || Haleakala || Pan-STARRS ||  || align=right | 2.2 km || 
|-id=550 bgcolor=#E9E9E9
| 599550 ||  || — || May 17, 2010 || Nogales || M. Schwartz, P. R. Holvorcem ||  || align=right | 1.6 km || 
|-id=551 bgcolor=#fefefe
| 599551 ||  || — || May 11, 2010 || Mount Lemmon || Mount Lemmon Survey ||  || align=right data-sort-value="0.55" | 550 m || 
|-id=552 bgcolor=#fefefe
| 599552 ||  || — || June 10, 2010 || Mount Lemmon || Mount Lemmon Survey || H || align=right data-sort-value="0.72" | 720 m || 
|-id=553 bgcolor=#fefefe
| 599553 ||  || — || June 13, 2010 || Mount Lemmon || Mount Lemmon Survey ||  || align=right data-sort-value="0.59" | 590 m || 
|-id=554 bgcolor=#E9E9E9
| 599554 ||  || — || May 8, 2006 || Mount Lemmon || Mount Lemmon Survey ||  || align=right | 2.1 km || 
|-id=555 bgcolor=#E9E9E9
| 599555 ||  || — || October 8, 2008 || Mount Lemmon || Mount Lemmon Survey ||  || align=right | 1.7 km || 
|-id=556 bgcolor=#E9E9E9
| 599556 ||  || — || December 4, 2012 || Mount Lemmon || Mount Lemmon Survey ||  || align=right | 1.3 km || 
|-id=557 bgcolor=#d6d6d6
| 599557 ||  || — || October 29, 2000 || Kitt Peak || Spacewatch ||  || align=right | 2.3 km || 
|-id=558 bgcolor=#E9E9E9
| 599558 ||  || — || December 30, 2013 || Kitt Peak || Spacewatch ||  || align=right | 1.9 km || 
|-id=559 bgcolor=#E9E9E9
| 599559 ||  || — || November 25, 2016 || Mount Lemmon || Mount Lemmon Survey ||  || align=right | 1.1 km || 
|-id=560 bgcolor=#d6d6d6
| 599560 ||  || — || October 12, 2016 || Haleakala || Pan-STARRS ||  || align=right | 2.5 km || 
|-id=561 bgcolor=#fefefe
| 599561 ||  || — || June 14, 2010 || Mount Lemmon || Mount Lemmon Survey ||  || align=right data-sort-value="0.78" | 780 m || 
|-id=562 bgcolor=#E9E9E9
| 599562 ||  || — || June 17, 2010 || Mount Lemmon || Mount Lemmon Survey ||  || align=right | 2.0 km || 
|-id=563 bgcolor=#fefefe
| 599563 ||  || — || June 20, 2010 || ESA OGS || ESA OGS ||  || align=right data-sort-value="0.80" | 800 m || 
|-id=564 bgcolor=#d6d6d6
| 599564 ||  || — || March 6, 2008 || Mount Lemmon || Mount Lemmon Survey ||  || align=right | 2.2 km || 
|-id=565 bgcolor=#E9E9E9
| 599565 ||  || — || December 30, 2013 || Haleakala || Pan-STARRS ||  || align=right | 1.1 km || 
|-id=566 bgcolor=#d6d6d6
| 599566 ||  || — || June 25, 2015 || Haleakala || Pan-STARRS 2 || Tj (2.99) || align=right | 3.5 km || 
|-id=567 bgcolor=#d6d6d6
| 599567 ||  || — || January 17, 2015 || Mount Lemmon || Mount Lemmon Survey ||  || align=right | 2.1 km || 
|-id=568 bgcolor=#d6d6d6
| 599568 ||  || — || August 21, 2015 || Haleakala || Pan-STARRS ||  || align=right | 1.6 km || 
|-id=569 bgcolor=#d6d6d6
| 599569 ||  || — || June 26, 2015 || Haleakala || Pan-STARRS ||  || align=right | 2.5 km || 
|-id=570 bgcolor=#C2FFFF
| 599570 ||  || — || June 19, 2010 || Mount Lemmon || Mount Lemmon Survey || L5 || align=right | 8.5 km || 
|-id=571 bgcolor=#fefefe
| 599571 ||  || — || October 8, 2007 || Mount Lemmon || Mount Lemmon Survey ||  || align=right data-sort-value="0.72" | 720 m || 
|-id=572 bgcolor=#E9E9E9
| 599572 ||  || — || July 7, 2010 || Mount Lemmon || Mount Lemmon Survey ||  || align=right | 1.9 km || 
|-id=573 bgcolor=#d6d6d6
| 599573 ||  || — || July 7, 2010 || WISE || WISE ||  || align=right | 2.9 km || 
|-id=574 bgcolor=#d6d6d6
| 599574 ||  || — || July 9, 2010 || WISE || WISE ||  || align=right | 2.3 km || 
|-id=575 bgcolor=#d6d6d6
| 599575 ||  || — || July 10, 2010 || WISE || WISE ||  || align=right | 2.1 km || 
|-id=576 bgcolor=#fefefe
| 599576 ||  || — || July 6, 2010 || Catalina || CSS ||  || align=right data-sort-value="0.97" | 970 m || 
|-id=577 bgcolor=#d6d6d6
| 599577 ||  || — || January 10, 2007 || Kitt Peak || Spacewatch ||  || align=right | 2.4 km || 
|-id=578 bgcolor=#E9E9E9
| 599578 ||  || — || October 22, 2012 || Haleakala || Pan-STARRS ||  || align=right | 1.9 km || 
|-id=579 bgcolor=#E9E9E9
| 599579 ||  || — || December 22, 2008 || Mount Lemmon || Mount Lemmon Survey ||  || align=right | 1.4 km || 
|-id=580 bgcolor=#d6d6d6
| 599580 ||  || — || January 4, 2014 || Haleakala || Pan-STARRS ||  || align=right | 2.8 km || 
|-id=581 bgcolor=#d6d6d6
| 599581 ||  || — || November 27, 2017 || Calar Alto-CASADO || S. Hellmich, S. Mottola ||  || align=right | 2.2 km || 
|-id=582 bgcolor=#d6d6d6
| 599582 ||  || — || July 19, 2010 || Bergisch Gladbach || W. Bickel ||  || align=right | 2.3 km || 
|-id=583 bgcolor=#fefefe
| 599583 ||  || — || August 22, 2017 || XuYi || PMO NEO ||  || align=right data-sort-value="0.66" | 660 m || 
|-id=584 bgcolor=#E9E9E9
| 599584 ||  || — || January 16, 2009 || Kitt Peak || Spacewatch ||  || align=right | 1.9 km || 
|-id=585 bgcolor=#d6d6d6
| 599585 ||  || — || September 19, 2017 || Haleakala || Pan-STARRS ||  || align=right | 2.1 km || 
|-id=586 bgcolor=#d6d6d6
| 599586 ||  || — || June 24, 2015 || Haleakala || Pan-STARRS ||  || align=right | 2.5 km || 
|-id=587 bgcolor=#fefefe
| 599587 ||  || — || September 21, 2007 || XuYi || PMO NEO ||  || align=right data-sort-value="0.58" | 580 m || 
|-id=588 bgcolor=#fefefe
| 599588 ||  || — || August 4, 2010 || Socorro || LINEAR ||  || align=right data-sort-value="0.66" | 660 m || 
|-id=589 bgcolor=#E9E9E9
| 599589 ||  || — || July 29, 2001 || Palomar || NEAT ||  || align=right | 2.2 km || 
|-id=590 bgcolor=#d6d6d6
| 599590 ||  || — || August 31, 2017 || Haleakala || Pan-STARRS ||  || align=right | 3.0 km || 
|-id=591 bgcolor=#d6d6d6
| 599591 ||  || — || July 23, 2015 || Haleakala || Pan-STARRS ||  || align=right | 2.2 km || 
|-id=592 bgcolor=#fefefe
| 599592 ||  || — || August 10, 2010 || Kitt Peak || Spacewatch ||  || align=right data-sort-value="0.60" | 600 m || 
|-id=593 bgcolor=#fefefe
| 599593 ||  || — || September 1, 2010 || Socorro || LINEAR || H || align=right data-sort-value="0.56" | 560 m || 
|-id=594 bgcolor=#fefefe
| 599594 ||  || — || September 19, 2003 || Kitt Peak || Spacewatch ||  || align=right data-sort-value="0.56" | 560 m || 
|-id=595 bgcolor=#fefefe
| 599595 ||  || — || September 3, 2010 || Mount Lemmon || Mount Lemmon Survey ||  || align=right data-sort-value="0.67" | 670 m || 
|-id=596 bgcolor=#d6d6d6
| 599596 ||  || — || September 2, 2010 || Mount Lemmon || Mount Lemmon Survey ||  || align=right | 2.0 km || 
|-id=597 bgcolor=#fefefe
| 599597 ||  || — || August 13, 2010 || Kitt Peak || Spacewatch ||  || align=right data-sort-value="0.67" | 670 m || 
|-id=598 bgcolor=#E9E9E9
| 599598 ||  || — || December 30, 2007 || Kitt Peak || Spacewatch ||  || align=right | 1.3 km || 
|-id=599 bgcolor=#d6d6d6
| 599599 ||  || — || August 12, 2010 || Kitt Peak || Spacewatch ||  || align=right | 1.8 km || 
|-id=600 bgcolor=#d6d6d6
| 599600 ||  || — || September 3, 2010 || Sierra Stars || R. Matson ||  || align=right | 2.6 km || 
|}

599601–599700 

|-bgcolor=#fefefe
| 599601 ||  || — || September 4, 2010 || Mount Lemmon || Mount Lemmon Survey ||  || align=right data-sort-value="0.64" | 640 m || 
|-id=602 bgcolor=#E9E9E9
| 599602 ||  || — || September 2, 2010 || Mount Lemmon || Mount Lemmon Survey ||  || align=right | 1.8 km || 
|-id=603 bgcolor=#E9E9E9
| 599603 ||  || — || January 13, 2016 || Haleakala || Pan-STARRS ||  || align=right | 1.0 km || 
|-id=604 bgcolor=#E9E9E9
| 599604 ||  || — || September 4, 2010 || Kitt Peak || Spacewatch ||  || align=right | 1.5 km || 
|-id=605 bgcolor=#d6d6d6
| 599605 ||  || — || September 4, 2010 || Kitt Peak || Spacewatch || EOS || align=right | 1.2 km || 
|-id=606 bgcolor=#fefefe
| 599606 ||  || — || November 7, 2007 || Kitt Peak || Spacewatch ||  || align=right data-sort-value="0.61" | 610 m || 
|-id=607 bgcolor=#fefefe
| 599607 ||  || — || October 19, 2003 || Kitt Peak || Spacewatch ||  || align=right data-sort-value="0.66" | 660 m || 
|-id=608 bgcolor=#d6d6d6
| 599608 ||  || — || September 6, 2010 || Kitt Peak || Spacewatch || 3:2 || align=right | 4.4 km || 
|-id=609 bgcolor=#fefefe
| 599609 ||  || — || September 6, 2010 || La Sagra || OAM Obs. ||  || align=right data-sort-value="0.64" | 640 m || 
|-id=610 bgcolor=#fefefe
| 599610 ||  || — || November 13, 2007 || Kitt Peak || Spacewatch ||  || align=right data-sort-value="0.79" | 790 m || 
|-id=611 bgcolor=#fefefe
| 599611 ||  || — || July 25, 2017 || Haleakala || Pan-STARRS ||  || align=right data-sort-value="0.55" | 550 m || 
|-id=612 bgcolor=#fefefe
| 599612 ||  || — || September 10, 2010 || Kitt Peak || Spacewatch ||  || align=right data-sort-value="0.74" | 740 m || 
|-id=613 bgcolor=#d6d6d6
| 599613 ||  || — || September 10, 2010 || Mount Lemmon || Mount Lemmon Survey ||  || align=right | 2.3 km || 
|-id=614 bgcolor=#d6d6d6
| 599614 ||  || — || September 11, 2010 || Mount Lemmon || Mount Lemmon Survey ||  || align=right | 2.4 km || 
|-id=615 bgcolor=#d6d6d6
| 599615 ||  || — || September 12, 2010 || Mount Lemmon || Mount Lemmon Survey ||  || align=right | 2.5 km || 
|-id=616 bgcolor=#d6d6d6
| 599616 ||  || — || September 12, 2010 || Mount Lemmon || Mount Lemmon Survey ||  || align=right | 2.4 km || 
|-id=617 bgcolor=#d6d6d6
| 599617 ||  || — || September 12, 2010 || Mount Lemmon || Mount Lemmon Survey ||  || align=right | 2.0 km || 
|-id=618 bgcolor=#d6d6d6
| 599618 ||  || — || August 25, 2005 || Palomar || NEAT ||  || align=right | 2.9 km || 
|-id=619 bgcolor=#fefefe
| 599619 ||  || — || September 19, 2003 || Kitt Peak || Spacewatch ||  || align=right data-sort-value="0.74" | 740 m || 
|-id=620 bgcolor=#d6d6d6
| 599620 ||  || — || February 8, 2007 || Mount Lemmon || Mount Lemmon Survey ||  || align=right | 2.4 km || 
|-id=621 bgcolor=#d6d6d6
| 599621 ||  || — || September 10, 2010 || Kitt Peak || Spacewatch || EOS || align=right | 1.3 km || 
|-id=622 bgcolor=#fefefe
| 599622 ||  || — || September 2, 2010 || Mount Lemmon || Mount Lemmon Survey ||  || align=right data-sort-value="0.64" | 640 m || 
|-id=623 bgcolor=#fefefe
| 599623 ||  || — || September 11, 2010 || Kitt Peak || Spacewatch || H || align=right data-sort-value="0.66" | 660 m || 
|-id=624 bgcolor=#d6d6d6
| 599624 ||  || — || October 28, 2005 || Mount Lemmon || Mount Lemmon Survey ||  || align=right | 1.7 km || 
|-id=625 bgcolor=#d6d6d6
| 599625 ||  || — || September 11, 2010 || Kitt Peak || Spacewatch ||  || align=right | 2.5 km || 
|-id=626 bgcolor=#d6d6d6
| 599626 ||  || — || September 14, 2010 || Mount Lemmon || Mount Lemmon Survey ||  || align=right | 1.7 km || 
|-id=627 bgcolor=#d6d6d6
| 599627 ||  || — || October 9, 2005 || Kitt Peak || Spacewatch ||  || align=right | 2.3 km || 
|-id=628 bgcolor=#d6d6d6
| 599628 ||  || — || September 15, 2010 || Mount Lemmon || Mount Lemmon Survey ||  || align=right | 2.4 km || 
|-id=629 bgcolor=#fefefe
| 599629 ||  || — || September 10, 2010 || Mount Lemmon || Mount Lemmon Survey ||  || align=right data-sort-value="0.84" | 840 m || 
|-id=630 bgcolor=#FA8072
| 599630 ||  || — || September 15, 2010 || Kitt Peak || Spacewatch ||  || align=right | 1.9 km || 
|-id=631 bgcolor=#FA8072
| 599631 ||  || — || October 10, 2007 || Kitt Peak || Spacewatch ||  || align=right data-sort-value="0.53" | 530 m || 
|-id=632 bgcolor=#d6d6d6
| 599632 ||  || — || September 15, 2010 || Kitt Peak || Spacewatch ||  || align=right | 1.7 km || 
|-id=633 bgcolor=#fefefe
| 599633 ||  || — || September 5, 2010 || Mount Lemmon || Mount Lemmon Survey || H || align=right data-sort-value="0.53" | 530 m || 
|-id=634 bgcolor=#d6d6d6
| 599634 ||  || — || October 11, 2005 || Kitt Peak || Spacewatch ||  || align=right | 2.1 km || 
|-id=635 bgcolor=#d6d6d6
| 599635 ||  || — || August 21, 2015 || Haleakala || Pan-STARRS ||  || align=right | 2.1 km || 
|-id=636 bgcolor=#fefefe
| 599636 ||  || — || September 14, 2010 || Kitt Peak || Spacewatch ||  || align=right data-sort-value="0.62" | 620 m || 
|-id=637 bgcolor=#fefefe
| 599637 ||  || — || November 21, 2014 || Haleakala || Pan-STARRS ||  || align=right data-sort-value="0.67" | 670 m || 
|-id=638 bgcolor=#d6d6d6
| 599638 ||  || — || June 4, 2014 || Haleakala || Pan-STARRS ||  || align=right | 2.6 km || 
|-id=639 bgcolor=#d6d6d6
| 599639 ||  || — || February 16, 2013 || Mount Lemmon || Mount Lemmon Survey ||  || align=right | 1.6 km || 
|-id=640 bgcolor=#fefefe
| 599640 ||  || — || January 8, 2016 || Haleakala || Pan-STARRS ||  || align=right data-sort-value="0.56" | 560 m || 
|-id=641 bgcolor=#d6d6d6
| 599641 ||  || — || March 5, 2013 || Haleakala || Pan-STARRS ||  || align=right | 2.4 km || 
|-id=642 bgcolor=#d6d6d6
| 599642 ||  || — || February 15, 2013 || Haleakala || Pan-STARRS ||  || align=right | 2.6 km || 
|-id=643 bgcolor=#d6d6d6
| 599643 ||  || — || September 15, 2010 || Mount Lemmon || Mount Lemmon Survey ||  || align=right | 2.0 km || 
|-id=644 bgcolor=#d6d6d6
| 599644 ||  || — || January 16, 2018 || Haleakala || Pan-STARRS ||  || align=right | 2.2 km || 
|-id=645 bgcolor=#d6d6d6
| 599645 ||  || — || June 27, 2015 || Haleakala || Pan-STARRS ||  || align=right | 1.8 km || 
|-id=646 bgcolor=#d6d6d6
| 599646 ||  || — || September 12, 2010 || Kitt Peak || Spacewatch ||  || align=right | 2.1 km || 
|-id=647 bgcolor=#d6d6d6
| 599647 ||  || — || March 11, 2002 || Palomar || NEAT ||  || align=right | 3.6 km || 
|-id=648 bgcolor=#fefefe
| 599648 ||  || — || September 17, 2010 || Kitt Peak || Spacewatch ||  || align=right data-sort-value="0.60" | 600 m || 
|-id=649 bgcolor=#fefefe
| 599649 ||  || — || September 17, 2010 || Mount Lemmon || Mount Lemmon Survey ||  || align=right data-sort-value="0.61" | 610 m || 
|-id=650 bgcolor=#fefefe
| 599650 ||  || — || September 16, 2010 || Bisei SG Center || A. Asami, K. Nishiyama ||  || align=right data-sort-value="0.70" | 700 m || 
|-id=651 bgcolor=#fefefe
| 599651 ||  || — || March 1, 2009 || Mount Lemmon || Mount Lemmon Survey || H || align=right data-sort-value="0.51" | 510 m || 
|-id=652 bgcolor=#fefefe
| 599652 ||  || — || September 29, 2010 || Mount Lemmon || Mount Lemmon Survey ||  || align=right | 1.0 km || 
|-id=653 bgcolor=#d6d6d6
| 599653 ||  || — || October 1, 2005 || Kitt Peak || Spacewatch ||  || align=right | 2.3 km || 
|-id=654 bgcolor=#d6d6d6
| 599654 ||  || — || January 10, 2007 || Kitt Peak || Spacewatch ||  || align=right | 3.2 km || 
|-id=655 bgcolor=#d6d6d6
| 599655 ||  || — || October 1, 2005 || Mount Lemmon || Mount Lemmon Survey ||  || align=right | 2.7 km || 
|-id=656 bgcolor=#d6d6d6
| 599656 ||  || — || September 16, 2010 || Kitt Peak || Spacewatch ||  || align=right | 2.8 km || 
|-id=657 bgcolor=#d6d6d6
| 599657 ||  || — || September 30, 2010 || Mount Lemmon || Mount Lemmon Survey ||  || align=right | 2.5 km || 
|-id=658 bgcolor=#fefefe
| 599658 ||  || — || September 18, 2010 || Mount Lemmon || Mount Lemmon Survey ||  || align=right data-sort-value="0.62" | 620 m || 
|-id=659 bgcolor=#d6d6d6
| 599659 ||  || — || September 18, 2010 || Mount Lemmon || Mount Lemmon Survey ||  || align=right | 3.3 km || 
|-id=660 bgcolor=#fefefe
| 599660 ||  || — || September 18, 2010 || Kitt Peak || Spacewatch ||  || align=right data-sort-value="0.53" | 530 m || 
|-id=661 bgcolor=#d6d6d6
| 599661 ||  || — || May 7, 2014 || Haleakala || Pan-STARRS ||  || align=right | 1.9 km || 
|-id=662 bgcolor=#d6d6d6
| 599662 ||  || — || September 18, 2010 || Mount Lemmon || Mount Lemmon Survey ||  || align=right | 2.3 km || 
|-id=663 bgcolor=#d6d6d6
| 599663 ||  || — || December 30, 2011 || Mount Lemmon || Mount Lemmon Survey ||  || align=right | 2.3 km || 
|-id=664 bgcolor=#d6d6d6
| 599664 ||  || — || September 29, 2010 || Mount Lemmon || Mount Lemmon Survey ||  || align=right | 1.8 km || 
|-id=665 bgcolor=#d6d6d6
| 599665 ||  || — || September 30, 2010 || Mount Lemmon || Mount Lemmon Survey ||  || align=right | 1.9 km || 
|-id=666 bgcolor=#fefefe
| 599666 ||  || — || September 18, 2010 || Mount Lemmon || Mount Lemmon Survey ||  || align=right data-sort-value="0.45" | 450 m || 
|-id=667 bgcolor=#fefefe
| 599667 ||  || — || September 18, 2010 || Mount Lemmon || Mount Lemmon Survey ||  || align=right data-sort-value="0.60" | 600 m || 
|-id=668 bgcolor=#fefefe
| 599668 ||  || — || October 1, 2010 || Vail-Jarnac || T. Glinos ||  || align=right data-sort-value="0.81" | 810 m || 
|-id=669 bgcolor=#d6d6d6
| 599669 ||  || — || October 1, 2010 || Kitt Peak || Spacewatch ||  || align=right | 2.0 km || 
|-id=670 bgcolor=#E9E9E9
| 599670 ||  || — || September 11, 2010 || Kitt Peak || Spacewatch ||  || align=right | 1.2 km || 
|-id=671 bgcolor=#d6d6d6
| 599671 ||  || — || October 7, 2005 || Mount Lemmon || Mount Lemmon Survey ||  || align=right | 2.0 km || 
|-id=672 bgcolor=#d6d6d6
| 599672 ||  || — || April 29, 2008 || Mount Lemmon || Mount Lemmon Survey ||  || align=right | 2.5 km || 
|-id=673 bgcolor=#d6d6d6
| 599673 ||  || — || October 3, 2010 || Kitt Peak || Spacewatch ||  || align=right | 1.8 km || 
|-id=674 bgcolor=#E9E9E9
| 599674 ||  || — || October 7, 2010 || Piszkesteto || Z. Kuli ||  || align=right | 1.1 km || 
|-id=675 bgcolor=#d6d6d6
| 599675 ||  || — || September 5, 2010 || Ondrejov || Ondřejov Obs. ||  || align=right | 2.6 km || 
|-id=676 bgcolor=#d6d6d6
| 599676 ||  || — || September 28, 2010 || Kitt Peak || Spacewatch ||  || align=right | 1.7 km || 
|-id=677 bgcolor=#fefefe
| 599677 ||  || — || March 21, 2009 || Kitt Peak || Spacewatch ||  || align=right data-sort-value="0.64" | 640 m || 
|-id=678 bgcolor=#fefefe
| 599678 ||  || — || October 8, 2010 || Kitt Peak || Spacewatch ||  || align=right data-sort-value="0.63" | 630 m || 
|-id=679 bgcolor=#fefefe
| 599679 ||  || — || September 9, 2010 || Kitt Peak || Spacewatch ||  || align=right data-sort-value="0.58" | 580 m || 
|-id=680 bgcolor=#fefefe
| 599680 ||  || — || October 8, 2010 || Sandlot || G. Hug ||  || align=right data-sort-value="0.70" | 700 m || 
|-id=681 bgcolor=#d6d6d6
| 599681 ||  || — || September 9, 2010 || Charleston || R. Holmes ||  || align=right | 2.1 km || 
|-id=682 bgcolor=#fefefe
| 599682 ||  || — || October 1, 2010 || Mount Lemmon || Mount Lemmon Survey ||  || align=right data-sort-value="0.57" | 570 m || 
|-id=683 bgcolor=#fefefe
| 599683 ||  || — || November 15, 2003 || Palomar || NEAT ||  || align=right data-sort-value="0.90" | 900 m || 
|-id=684 bgcolor=#fefefe
| 599684 ||  || — || March 11, 2005 || Kitt Peak || Spacewatch ||  || align=right data-sort-value="0.83" | 830 m || 
|-id=685 bgcolor=#fefefe
| 599685 ||  || — || October 9, 2010 || Kitt Peak || Spacewatch ||  || align=right data-sort-value="0.57" | 570 m || 
|-id=686 bgcolor=#d6d6d6
| 599686 ||  || — || October 10, 2010 || Mount Lemmon || Mount Lemmon Survey ||  || align=right | 2.2 km || 
|-id=687 bgcolor=#d6d6d6
| 599687 ||  || — || October 2, 2010 || Kitt Peak || Spacewatch ||  || align=right | 1.6 km || 
|-id=688 bgcolor=#d6d6d6
| 599688 ||  || — || October 11, 2010 || Mount Lemmon || Mount Lemmon Survey ||  || align=right | 1.9 km || 
|-id=689 bgcolor=#d6d6d6
| 599689 ||  || — || December 25, 2005 || Mount Lemmon || Mount Lemmon Survey ||  || align=right | 2.2 km || 
|-id=690 bgcolor=#fefefe
| 599690 ||  || — || October 11, 2010 || Mount Lemmon || Mount Lemmon Survey ||  || align=right data-sort-value="0.57" | 570 m || 
|-id=691 bgcolor=#fefefe
| 599691 ||  || — || October 9, 2010 || Bergisch Gladbach || W. Bickel ||  || align=right data-sort-value="0.65" | 650 m || 
|-id=692 bgcolor=#d6d6d6
| 599692 ||  || — || September 4, 2010 || Kitt Peak || Spacewatch ||  || align=right | 2.1 km || 
|-id=693 bgcolor=#d6d6d6
| 599693 ||  || — || October 10, 2010 || Mount Lemmon || Mount Lemmon Survey ||  || align=right | 2.1 km || 
|-id=694 bgcolor=#d6d6d6
| 599694 ||  || — || October 25, 2005 || Mount Lemmon || Mount Lemmon Survey || EOS || align=right | 1.4 km || 
|-id=695 bgcolor=#d6d6d6
| 599695 ||  || — || October 13, 2010 || Mount Lemmon || Mount Lemmon Survey ||  || align=right | 2.4 km || 
|-id=696 bgcolor=#fefefe
| 599696 ||  || — || October 10, 2010 || Mount Lemmon || Mount Lemmon Survey ||  || align=right data-sort-value="0.72" | 720 m || 
|-id=697 bgcolor=#fefefe
| 599697 ||  || — || July 14, 2013 || Haleakala || Pan-STARRS ||  || align=right data-sort-value="0.52" | 520 m || 
|-id=698 bgcolor=#C2FFFF
| 599698 ||  || — || October 12, 2010 || Mount Lemmon || Mount Lemmon Survey || L4 || align=right | 6.8 km || 
|-id=699 bgcolor=#E9E9E9
| 599699 ||  || — || October 1, 2010 || Mount Lemmon || Mount Lemmon Survey ||  || align=right | 1.7 km || 
|-id=700 bgcolor=#fefefe
| 599700 ||  || — || October 12, 2010 || Mount Lemmon || Mount Lemmon Survey ||  || align=right data-sort-value="0.61" | 610 m || 
|}

599701–599800 

|-bgcolor=#d6d6d6
| 599701 ||  || — || October 12, 2010 || Mount Lemmon || Mount Lemmon Survey ||  || align=right | 2.2 km || 
|-id=702 bgcolor=#d6d6d6
| 599702 ||  || — || November 24, 2011 || Mount Lemmon || Mount Lemmon Survey ||  || align=right | 2.5 km || 
|-id=703 bgcolor=#fefefe
| 599703 ||  || — || October 12, 2010 || Mount Lemmon || Mount Lemmon Survey ||  || align=right data-sort-value="0.73" | 730 m || 
|-id=704 bgcolor=#fefefe
| 599704 ||  || — || October 12, 2010 || Mount Lemmon || Mount Lemmon Survey ||  || align=right data-sort-value="0.56" | 560 m || 
|-id=705 bgcolor=#E9E9E9
| 599705 ||  || — || October 10, 2010 || Kitt Peak || Spacewatch ||  || align=right | 1.6 km || 
|-id=706 bgcolor=#d6d6d6
| 599706 ||  || — || November 25, 2005 || Kitt Peak || Spacewatch ||  || align=right | 2.0 km || 
|-id=707 bgcolor=#fefefe
| 599707 ||  || — || June 18, 2013 || Haleakala || Pan-STARRS ||  || align=right data-sort-value="0.64" | 640 m || 
|-id=708 bgcolor=#d6d6d6
| 599708 ||  || — || May 7, 2014 || Haleakala || Pan-STARRS ||  || align=right | 1.4 km || 
|-id=709 bgcolor=#fefefe
| 599709 ||  || — || October 13, 2010 || Mount Lemmon || Mount Lemmon Survey || H || align=right data-sort-value="0.51" | 510 m || 
|-id=710 bgcolor=#fefefe
| 599710 ||  || — || October 1, 2010 || Mount Lemmon || Mount Lemmon Survey ||  || align=right data-sort-value="0.56" | 560 m || 
|-id=711 bgcolor=#d6d6d6
| 599711 ||  || — || October 13, 2010 || Mount Lemmon || Mount Lemmon Survey ||  || align=right | 2.5 km || 
|-id=712 bgcolor=#fefefe
| 599712 ||  || — || September 28, 2010 || Kitt Peak || Spacewatch ||  || align=right data-sort-value="0.55" | 550 m || 
|-id=713 bgcolor=#E9E9E9
| 599713 ||  || — || October 2, 2010 || Kitt Peak || Spacewatch ||  || align=right data-sort-value="0.63" | 630 m || 
|-id=714 bgcolor=#d6d6d6
| 599714 ||  || — || October 13, 2010 || Mount Lemmon || Mount Lemmon Survey ||  || align=right | 2.6 km || 
|-id=715 bgcolor=#FA8072
| 599715 ||  || — || September 16, 2003 || Kitt Peak || Spacewatch ||  || align=right data-sort-value="0.56" | 560 m || 
|-id=716 bgcolor=#d6d6d6
| 599716 ||  || — || October 17, 2010 || Mount Lemmon || Mount Lemmon Survey ||  || align=right | 2.4 km || 
|-id=717 bgcolor=#d6d6d6
| 599717 ||  || — || October 17, 2010 || Kitt Peak || Spacewatch ||  || align=right | 2.0 km || 
|-id=718 bgcolor=#fefefe
| 599718 ||  || — || September 17, 2010 || Mount Lemmon || Mount Lemmon Survey ||  || align=right data-sort-value="0.59" | 590 m || 
|-id=719 bgcolor=#fefefe
| 599719 ||  || — || October 28, 2010 || Mount Lemmon || Mount Lemmon Survey ||  || align=right data-sort-value="0.72" | 720 m || 
|-id=720 bgcolor=#d6d6d6
| 599720 ||  || — || September 25, 2005 || Kitt Peak || Spacewatch ||  || align=right | 1.9 km || 
|-id=721 bgcolor=#fefefe
| 599721 ||  || — || December 14, 2003 || Kitt Peak || Spacewatch ||  || align=right data-sort-value="0.64" | 640 m || 
|-id=722 bgcolor=#d6d6d6
| 599722 ||  || — || October 28, 2010 || Piszkesteto || Z. Kuli, K. Sárneczky ||  || align=right | 2.7 km || 
|-id=723 bgcolor=#fefefe
| 599723 ||  || — || October 12, 2010 || Mount Lemmon || Mount Lemmon Survey ||  || align=right data-sort-value="0.71" | 710 m || 
|-id=724 bgcolor=#d6d6d6
| 599724 ||  || — || October 30, 2010 || Mount Lemmon || Mount Lemmon Survey ||  || align=right | 2.3 km || 
|-id=725 bgcolor=#d6d6d6
| 599725 ||  || — || October 31, 2010 || Piszkesteto || Z. Kuli, K. Sárneczky ||  || align=right | 3.0 km || 
|-id=726 bgcolor=#fefefe
| 599726 ||  || — || September 15, 2010 || Charleston || R. Holmes ||  || align=right data-sort-value="0.53" | 530 m || 
|-id=727 bgcolor=#fefefe
| 599727 ||  || — || October 30, 2010 || Mount Lemmon || Mount Lemmon Survey || H || align=right data-sort-value="0.40" | 400 m || 
|-id=728 bgcolor=#C2FFFF
| 599728 ||  || — || September 20, 2009 || Kitt Peak || Spacewatch || L4 || align=right | 7.0 km || 
|-id=729 bgcolor=#fefefe
| 599729 ||  || — || October 9, 2010 || Mount Lemmon || Mount Lemmon Survey ||  || align=right data-sort-value="0.68" | 680 m || 
|-id=730 bgcolor=#d6d6d6
| 599730 ||  || — || October 19, 2010 || Mount Lemmon || Mount Lemmon Survey ||  || align=right | 2.4 km || 
|-id=731 bgcolor=#E9E9E9
| 599731 ||  || — || October 31, 2010 || Mount Lemmon || Mount Lemmon Survey ||  || align=right data-sort-value="0.76" | 760 m || 
|-id=732 bgcolor=#fefefe
| 599732 ||  || — || October 13, 2010 || Mount Lemmon || Mount Lemmon Survey ||  || align=right data-sort-value="0.62" | 620 m || 
|-id=733 bgcolor=#fefefe
| 599733 ||  || — || October 12, 2010 || Mount Lemmon || Mount Lemmon Survey ||  || align=right data-sort-value="0.63" | 630 m || 
|-id=734 bgcolor=#d6d6d6
| 599734 ||  || — || October 17, 2010 || Mount Lemmon || Mount Lemmon Survey ||  || align=right | 2.5 km || 
|-id=735 bgcolor=#d6d6d6
| 599735 ||  || — || May 8, 2002 || Kitt Peak || Spacewatch ||  || align=right | 2.3 km || 
|-id=736 bgcolor=#fefefe
| 599736 ||  || — || July 24, 2003 || Palomar || NEAT ||  || align=right data-sort-value="0.62" | 620 m || 
|-id=737 bgcolor=#fefefe
| 599737 ||  || — || October 28, 2010 || Mount Lemmon || Mount Lemmon Survey ||  || align=right data-sort-value="0.75" | 750 m || 
|-id=738 bgcolor=#fefefe
| 599738 ||  || — || June 19, 2006 || Mount Lemmon || Mount Lemmon Survey ||  || align=right data-sort-value="0.54" | 540 m || 
|-id=739 bgcolor=#d6d6d6
| 599739 ||  || — || January 12, 2018 || Haleakala || Pan-STARRS ||  || align=right | 2.0 km || 
|-id=740 bgcolor=#fefefe
| 599740 ||  || — || October 29, 2010 || Piszkesteto || Z. Kuli, K. Sárneczky ||  || align=right data-sort-value="0.49" | 490 m || 
|-id=741 bgcolor=#C2FFFF
| 599741 ||  || — || October 17, 2010 || Mount Lemmon || Mount Lemmon Survey || L4 || align=right | 7.2 km || 
|-id=742 bgcolor=#d6d6d6
| 599742 ||  || — || October 31, 2010 || Mount Lemmon || Mount Lemmon Survey ||  || align=right | 1.7 km || 
|-id=743 bgcolor=#fefefe
| 599743 ||  || — || October 30, 2010 || Mount Lemmon || Mount Lemmon Survey ||  || align=right data-sort-value="0.54" | 540 m || 
|-id=744 bgcolor=#d6d6d6
| 599744 ||  || — || October 31, 2010 || Mount Lemmon || Mount Lemmon Survey ||  || align=right | 2.2 km || 
|-id=745 bgcolor=#d6d6d6
| 599745 ||  || — || October 17, 2010 || Mount Lemmon || Mount Lemmon Survey ||  || align=right | 2.6 km || 
|-id=746 bgcolor=#d6d6d6
| 599746 ||  || — || November 1, 2010 || Mount Lemmon || Mount Lemmon Survey ||  || align=right | 2.2 km || 
|-id=747 bgcolor=#fefefe
| 599747 ||  || — || November 1, 2010 || Mount Lemmon || Mount Lemmon Survey ||  || align=right data-sort-value="0.51" | 510 m || 
|-id=748 bgcolor=#d6d6d6
| 599748 ||  || — || September 11, 2004 || Kitt Peak || Spacewatch ||  || align=right | 2.0 km || 
|-id=749 bgcolor=#E9E9E9
| 599749 ||  || — || November 1, 2010 || Mount Lemmon || Mount Lemmon Survey ||  || align=right data-sort-value="0.58" | 580 m || 
|-id=750 bgcolor=#d6d6d6
| 599750 ||  || — || November 1, 2010 || Mount Lemmon || Mount Lemmon Survey ||  || align=right | 1.8 km || 
|-id=751 bgcolor=#E9E9E9
| 599751 ||  || — || November 1, 2010 || Mount Lemmon || Mount Lemmon Survey ||  || align=right data-sort-value="0.75" | 750 m || 
|-id=752 bgcolor=#C2E0FF
| 599752 ||  || — || November 2, 2010 || La Silla || La Silla Obs. || cubewano?critical || align=right | 330 km || 
|-id=753 bgcolor=#fefefe
| 599753 ||  || — || October 14, 2010 || Mount Lemmon || Mount Lemmon Survey || H || align=right data-sort-value="0.68" | 680 m || 
|-id=754 bgcolor=#fefefe
| 599754 ||  || — || November 3, 2010 || Haleakala || Pan-STARRS || H || align=right data-sort-value="0.33" | 330 m || 
|-id=755 bgcolor=#d6d6d6
| 599755 Alcarràs ||  ||  || November 4, 2010 || SM Montmagastrell || J. M. Bosch ||  || align=right | 2.2 km || 
|-id=756 bgcolor=#d6d6d6
| 599756 ||  || — || November 1, 2010 || Mount Lemmon || Mount Lemmon Survey ||  || align=right | 2.1 km || 
|-id=757 bgcolor=#d6d6d6
| 599757 ||  || — || October 17, 2010 || Mount Lemmon || Mount Lemmon Survey ||  || align=right | 2.2 km || 
|-id=758 bgcolor=#d6d6d6
| 599758 ||  || — || November 1, 2010 || Mount Lemmon || Mount Lemmon Survey ||  || align=right | 2.0 km || 
|-id=759 bgcolor=#fefefe
| 599759 ||  || — || August 26, 2003 || Cerro Tololo || Cerro Tololo Obs. ||  || align=right data-sort-value="0.73" | 730 m || 
|-id=760 bgcolor=#d6d6d6
| 599760 ||  || — || November 4, 2010 || Mount Lemmon || Mount Lemmon Survey ||  || align=right | 2.6 km || 
|-id=761 bgcolor=#d6d6d6
| 599761 ||  || — || November 6, 2010 || Mount Lemmon || Mount Lemmon Survey ||  || align=right | 2.4 km || 
|-id=762 bgcolor=#fefefe
| 599762 ||  || — || May 7, 2006 || Mount Lemmon || Mount Lemmon Survey ||  || align=right data-sort-value="0.67" | 670 m || 
|-id=763 bgcolor=#fefefe
| 599763 ||  || — || October 28, 2010 || Catalina || CSS ||  || align=right data-sort-value="0.55" | 550 m || 
|-id=764 bgcolor=#fefefe
| 599764 ||  || — || November 3, 2010 || Mount Lemmon || Mount Lemmon Survey ||  || align=right data-sort-value="0.53" | 530 m || 
|-id=765 bgcolor=#fefefe
| 599765 ||  || — || August 27, 2006 || Kitt Peak || Spacewatch ||  || align=right data-sort-value="0.66" | 660 m || 
|-id=766 bgcolor=#d6d6d6
| 599766 ||  || — || October 22, 2005 || Kitt Peak || Spacewatch || EOS || align=right | 1.9 km || 
|-id=767 bgcolor=#fefefe
| 599767 ||  || — || July 21, 2006 || Mount Lemmon || Mount Lemmon Survey ||  || align=right data-sort-value="0.57" | 570 m || 
|-id=768 bgcolor=#fefefe
| 599768 ||  || — || July 25, 2006 || Mount Lemmon || Mount Lemmon Survey || MAS || align=right data-sort-value="0.60" | 600 m || 
|-id=769 bgcolor=#C2FFFF
| 599769 ||  || — || November 5, 2010 || Kitt Peak || Spacewatch || L4 || align=right | 8.2 km || 
|-id=770 bgcolor=#C2FFFF
| 599770 ||  || — || October 17, 2010 || Mount Lemmon || Mount Lemmon Survey || L4 || align=right | 7.0 km || 
|-id=771 bgcolor=#fefefe
| 599771 ||  || — || February 12, 2008 || Mount Lemmon || Mount Lemmon Survey ||  || align=right data-sort-value="0.52" | 520 m || 
|-id=772 bgcolor=#fefefe
| 599772 ||  || — || November 9, 2010 || Catalina || CSS ||  || align=right data-sort-value="0.80" | 800 m || 
|-id=773 bgcolor=#E9E9E9
| 599773 ||  || — || February 7, 2008 || Kitt Peak || Spacewatch ||  || align=right data-sort-value="0.87" | 870 m || 
|-id=774 bgcolor=#fefefe
| 599774 ||  || — || October 1, 2006 || Kitt Peak || Spacewatch ||  || align=right data-sort-value="0.67" | 670 m || 
|-id=775 bgcolor=#C2FFFF
| 599775 ||  || — || November 6, 2010 || Mount Lemmon || Mount Lemmon Survey || L4 || align=right | 6.5 km || 
|-id=776 bgcolor=#d6d6d6
| 599776 ||  || — || November 6, 2010 || Mount Lemmon || Mount Lemmon Survey ||  || align=right | 1.8 km || 
|-id=777 bgcolor=#d6d6d6
| 599777 ||  || — || November 6, 2010 || Mount Lemmon || Mount Lemmon Survey ||  || align=right | 2.3 km || 
|-id=778 bgcolor=#fefefe
| 599778 ||  || — || March 3, 2016 || Haleakala || Pan-STARRS ||  || align=right data-sort-value="0.62" | 620 m || 
|-id=779 bgcolor=#C2FFFF
| 599779 ||  || — || November 8, 2010 || Kitt Peak || Spacewatch || L4 || align=right | 8.4 km || 
|-id=780 bgcolor=#C2FFFF
| 599780 ||  || — || September 20, 2009 || Kitt Peak || Spacewatch || L4 || align=right | 6.1 km || 
|-id=781 bgcolor=#d6d6d6
| 599781 ||  || — || November 10, 2010 || Mount Lemmon || Mount Lemmon Survey ||  || align=right | 2.7 km || 
|-id=782 bgcolor=#C2FFFF
| 599782 ||  || — || September 17, 2009 || Kitt Peak || Spacewatch || L4 || align=right | 5.4 km || 
|-id=783 bgcolor=#E9E9E9
| 599783 ||  || — || November 23, 2006 || Kitt Peak || Spacewatch ||  || align=right data-sort-value="0.78" | 780 m || 
|-id=784 bgcolor=#d6d6d6
| 599784 ||  || — || November 11, 2010 || Mount Lemmon || Mount Lemmon Survey ||  || align=right | 2.4 km || 
|-id=785 bgcolor=#d6d6d6
| 599785 ||  || — || November 13, 2010 || Mount Lemmon || Mount Lemmon Survey ||  || align=right | 2.5 km || 
|-id=786 bgcolor=#fefefe
| 599786 ||  || — || November 13, 2010 || Mount Lemmon || Mount Lemmon Survey ||  || align=right data-sort-value="0.49" | 490 m || 
|-id=787 bgcolor=#C2FFFF
| 599787 ||  || — || November 13, 2010 || Mount Lemmon || Mount Lemmon Survey || L4 || align=right | 6.6 km || 
|-id=788 bgcolor=#d6d6d6
| 599788 ||  || — || October 11, 2010 || Mount Lemmon || Mount Lemmon Survey ||  || align=right | 3.0 km || 
|-id=789 bgcolor=#d6d6d6
| 599789 ||  || — || October 17, 2010 || Mount Lemmon || Mount Lemmon Survey ||  || align=right | 2.8 km || 
|-id=790 bgcolor=#d6d6d6
| 599790 ||  || — || November 11, 2010 || Catalina || CSS ||  || align=right | 2.6 km || 
|-id=791 bgcolor=#d6d6d6
| 599791 ||  || — || November 1, 2010 || Mount Lemmon || Mount Lemmon Survey ||  || align=right | 2.6 km || 
|-id=792 bgcolor=#d6d6d6
| 599792 ||  || — || November 4, 2010 || Mount Lemmon || Mount Lemmon Survey ||  || align=right | 2.3 km || 
|-id=793 bgcolor=#fefefe
| 599793 ||  || — || November 13, 2010 || Mount Lemmon || Mount Lemmon Survey ||  || align=right data-sort-value="0.63" | 630 m || 
|-id=794 bgcolor=#fefefe
| 599794 ||  || — || June 18, 2013 || Haleakala || Pan-STARRS ||  || align=right data-sort-value="0.57" | 570 m || 
|-id=795 bgcolor=#d6d6d6
| 599795 ||  || — || September 11, 2015 || Haleakala || Pan-STARRS ||  || align=right | 2.2 km || 
|-id=796 bgcolor=#fefefe
| 599796 ||  || — || March 2, 2016 || Haleakala || Pan-STARRS ||  || align=right data-sort-value="0.67" | 670 m || 
|-id=797 bgcolor=#E9E9E9
| 599797 ||  || — || June 3, 2014 || Haleakala || Pan-STARRS ||  || align=right | 1.5 km || 
|-id=798 bgcolor=#d6d6d6
| 599798 ||  || — || November 10, 2010 || Mount Lemmon || Mount Lemmon Survey ||  || align=right | 2.9 km || 
|-id=799 bgcolor=#fefefe
| 599799 ||  || — || November 26, 2014 || Haleakala || Pan-STARRS ||  || align=right data-sort-value="0.63" | 630 m || 
|-id=800 bgcolor=#d6d6d6
| 599800 ||  || — || March 8, 2018 || Haleakala || Pan-STARRS ||  || align=right | 2.6 km || 
|}

599801–599900 

|-bgcolor=#d6d6d6
| 599801 ||  || — || January 20, 2018 || Mount Lemmon || Mount Lemmon Survey ||  || align=right | 2.5 km || 
|-id=802 bgcolor=#d6d6d6
| 599802 ||  || — || December 5, 2015 || Haleakala || Pan-STARRS ||  || align=right | 3.0 km || 
|-id=803 bgcolor=#d6d6d6
| 599803 ||  || — || November 12, 2010 || Mount Lemmon || Mount Lemmon Survey ||  || align=right | 2.2 km || 
|-id=804 bgcolor=#d6d6d6
| 599804 ||  || — || November 13, 2010 || Mount Lemmon || Mount Lemmon Survey ||  || align=right | 2.5 km || 
|-id=805 bgcolor=#d6d6d6
| 599805 ||  || — || November 6, 2010 || Mount Lemmon || Mount Lemmon Survey ||  || align=right | 2.1 km || 
|-id=806 bgcolor=#d6d6d6
| 599806 ||  || — || November 3, 2010 || Mount Lemmon || Mount Lemmon Survey ||  || align=right | 2.5 km || 
|-id=807 bgcolor=#C2FFFF
| 599807 ||  || — || November 3, 2010 || Kitt Peak || Spacewatch || L4 || align=right | 7.2 km || 
|-id=808 bgcolor=#C2FFFF
| 599808 ||  || — || November 13, 2010 || Mount Lemmon || Mount Lemmon Survey || L4 || align=right | 6.7 km || 
|-id=809 bgcolor=#C2FFFF
| 599809 ||  || — || November 12, 2010 || Mount Lemmon || Mount Lemmon Survey || L4 || align=right | 6.9 km || 
|-id=810 bgcolor=#d6d6d6
| 599810 ||  || — || November 10, 2010 || Mount Lemmon || Mount Lemmon Survey ||  || align=right | 2.7 km || 
|-id=811 bgcolor=#E9E9E9
| 599811 ||  || — || November 10, 2010 || Mount Lemmon || Mount Lemmon Survey ||  || align=right | 1.7 km || 
|-id=812 bgcolor=#C2FFFF
| 599812 ||  || — || November 10, 2010 || Mount Lemmon || Mount Lemmon Survey || L4 || align=right | 6.6 km || 
|-id=813 bgcolor=#C2FFFF
| 599813 ||  || — || November 12, 2010 || Mount Lemmon || Mount Lemmon Survey || L4 || align=right | 7.3 km || 
|-id=814 bgcolor=#d6d6d6
| 599814 ||  || — || November 6, 2010 || Mount Lemmon || Mount Lemmon Survey ||  || align=right | 1.9 km || 
|-id=815 bgcolor=#d6d6d6
| 599815 ||  || — || November 11, 2010 || Mount Lemmon || Mount Lemmon Survey ||  || align=right | 2.4 km || 
|-id=816 bgcolor=#d6d6d6
| 599816 ||  || — || November 3, 2010 || Mount Lemmon || Mount Lemmon Survey ||  || align=right | 2.3 km || 
|-id=817 bgcolor=#d6d6d6
| 599817 ||  || — || January 24, 2001 || Kitt Peak || Spacewatch ||  || align=right | 2.5 km || 
|-id=818 bgcolor=#d6d6d6
| 599818 ||  || — || November 3, 2010 || Kitt Peak || Spacewatch ||  || align=right | 2.6 km || 
|-id=819 bgcolor=#d6d6d6
| 599819 ||  || — || November 2, 2010 || Mount Lemmon || Mount Lemmon Survey ||  || align=right | 1.8 km || 
|-id=820 bgcolor=#d6d6d6
| 599820 ||  || — || November 10, 2010 || Mount Lemmon || Mount Lemmon Survey ||  || align=right | 2.1 km || 
|-id=821 bgcolor=#C2FFFF
| 599821 ||  || — || November 2, 2010 || Mount Lemmon || Mount Lemmon Survey || L4 || align=right | 6.8 km || 
|-id=822 bgcolor=#C2FFFF
| 599822 ||  || — || November 8, 2010 || Mount Lemmon || Mount Lemmon Survey || L4 || align=right | 7.1 km || 
|-id=823 bgcolor=#C2FFFF
| 599823 ||  || — || November 6, 2010 || Mount Lemmon || Mount Lemmon Survey || L4 || align=right | 6.1 km || 
|-id=824 bgcolor=#C2FFFF
| 599824 ||  || — || November 1, 2010 || Kitt Peak || Spacewatch || L4 || align=right | 7.0 km || 
|-id=825 bgcolor=#C2FFFF
| 599825 ||  || — || November 1, 2010 || Mount Lemmon || Mount Lemmon Survey || L4 || align=right | 7.6 km || 
|-id=826 bgcolor=#fefefe
| 599826 ||  || — || November 10, 2010 || Mount Lemmon || Mount Lemmon Survey ||  || align=right data-sort-value="0.42" | 420 m || 
|-id=827 bgcolor=#E9E9E9
| 599827 ||  || — || November 1, 2010 || Mount Lemmon || Mount Lemmon Survey ||  || align=right | 1.4 km || 
|-id=828 bgcolor=#d6d6d6
| 599828 ||  || — || November 2, 2010 || Mount Lemmon || Mount Lemmon Survey ||  || align=right | 2.6 km || 
|-id=829 bgcolor=#d6d6d6
| 599829 ||  || — || January 7, 2006 || Mount Lemmon || Mount Lemmon Survey ||  || align=right | 1.6 km || 
|-id=830 bgcolor=#fefefe
| 599830 ||  || — || December 18, 2003 || Kitt Peak || Spacewatch ||  || align=right data-sort-value="0.86" | 860 m || 
|-id=831 bgcolor=#d6d6d6
| 599831 ||  || — || November 25, 2010 || Mount Lemmon || Mount Lemmon Survey ||  || align=right | 2.4 km || 
|-id=832 bgcolor=#E9E9E9
| 599832 ||  || — || November 27, 2010 || Mount Lemmon || Mount Lemmon Survey ||  || align=right | 1.2 km || 
|-id=833 bgcolor=#fefefe
| 599833 ||  || — || April 14, 2008 || Mount Lemmon || Mount Lemmon Survey ||  || align=right data-sort-value="0.63" | 630 m || 
|-id=834 bgcolor=#d6d6d6
| 599834 ||  || — || November 27, 2010 || Mount Lemmon || Mount Lemmon Survey ||  || align=right | 2.7 km || 
|-id=835 bgcolor=#fefefe
| 599835 ||  || — || November 27, 2010 || Mount Lemmon || Mount Lemmon Survey ||  || align=right data-sort-value="0.59" | 590 m || 
|-id=836 bgcolor=#d6d6d6
| 599836 ||  || — || November 27, 2010 || Mount Lemmon || Mount Lemmon Survey ||  || align=right | 2.6 km || 
|-id=837 bgcolor=#E9E9E9
| 599837 ||  || — || November 6, 2005 || Mount Lemmon || Mount Lemmon Survey ||  || align=right | 2.2 km || 
|-id=838 bgcolor=#fefefe
| 599838 ||  || — || November 1, 2010 || Kitt Peak || Spacewatch ||  || align=right data-sort-value="0.56" | 560 m || 
|-id=839 bgcolor=#fefefe
| 599839 ||  || — || November 10, 2010 || Mount Lemmon || Mount Lemmon Survey ||  || align=right data-sort-value="0.60" | 600 m || 
|-id=840 bgcolor=#d6d6d6
| 599840 ||  || — || January 31, 2006 || Kitt Peak || Spacewatch ||  || align=right | 2.3 km || 
|-id=841 bgcolor=#fefefe
| 599841 ||  || — || November 2, 2010 || Kitt Peak || Spacewatch ||  || align=right data-sort-value="0.66" | 660 m || 
|-id=842 bgcolor=#fefefe
| 599842 ||  || — || November 30, 2010 || Mount Lemmon || Mount Lemmon Survey ||  || align=right data-sort-value="0.62" | 620 m || 
|-id=843 bgcolor=#E9E9E9
| 599843 ||  || — || November 7, 2010 || Kitt Peak || Spacewatch ||  || align=right data-sort-value="0.64" | 640 m || 
|-id=844 bgcolor=#d6d6d6
| 599844 ||  || — || August 1, 2009 || Kitt Peak || Spacewatch ||  || align=right | 2.1 km || 
|-id=845 bgcolor=#d6d6d6
| 599845 ||  || — || December 2, 2010 || Mount Lemmon || Mount Lemmon Survey ||  || align=right | 2.0 km || 
|-id=846 bgcolor=#fefefe
| 599846 ||  || — || December 2, 2010 || Mount Lemmon || Mount Lemmon Survey ||  || align=right data-sort-value="0.69" | 690 m || 
|-id=847 bgcolor=#fefefe
| 599847 ||  || — || December 6, 2010 || Mount Lemmon || Mount Lemmon Survey || H || align=right data-sort-value="0.40" | 400 m || 
|-id=848 bgcolor=#fefefe
| 599848 ||  || — || December 1, 2002 || Eskridge || G. Hug || H || align=right data-sort-value="0.76" | 760 m || 
|-id=849 bgcolor=#C2FFFF
| 599849 ||  || — || December 2, 2010 || Mount Lemmon || Mount Lemmon Survey || L4 || align=right | 6.3 km || 
|-id=850 bgcolor=#fefefe
| 599850 ||  || — || October 23, 2006 || Kitt Peak || Spacewatch ||  || align=right data-sort-value="0.66" | 660 m || 
|-id=851 bgcolor=#E9E9E9
| 599851 ||  || — || December 3, 2010 || Kitt Peak || Spacewatch ||  || align=right | 1.6 km || 
|-id=852 bgcolor=#d6d6d6
| 599852 ||  || — || December 4, 2010 || Piszkesteto || Z. Kuli ||  || align=right | 2.1 km || 
|-id=853 bgcolor=#d6d6d6
| 599853 ||  || — || November 3, 2010 || Kitt Peak || Spacewatch ||  || align=right | 3.9 km || 
|-id=854 bgcolor=#d6d6d6
| 599854 ||  || — || November 2, 2010 || Mount Lemmon || Mount Lemmon Survey ||  || align=right | 2.5 km || 
|-id=855 bgcolor=#d6d6d6
| 599855 ||  || — || December 6, 2010 || Kitt Peak || Spacewatch ||  || align=right | 2.3 km || 
|-id=856 bgcolor=#fefefe
| 599856 ||  || — || December 17, 2007 || Mount Lemmon || Mount Lemmon Survey ||  || align=right data-sort-value="0.54" | 540 m || 
|-id=857 bgcolor=#fefefe
| 599857 ||  || — || August 18, 2006 || Palomar || NEAT ||  || align=right data-sort-value="0.76" | 760 m || 
|-id=858 bgcolor=#d6d6d6
| 599858 ||  || — || December 13, 2010 || Calvin-Rehoboth || L. A. Molnar ||  || align=right | 2.5 km || 
|-id=859 bgcolor=#d6d6d6
| 599859 ||  || — || December 1, 2010 || Mount Lemmon || Mount Lemmon Survey ||  || align=right | 3.1 km || 
|-id=860 bgcolor=#d6d6d6
| 599860 ||  || — || October 7, 2004 || Palomar || NEAT || TIR || align=right | 2.8 km || 
|-id=861 bgcolor=#C2FFFF
| 599861 ||  || — || March 22, 2014 || Mount Lemmon || Mount Lemmon Survey || L4 || align=right | 7.4 km || 
|-id=862 bgcolor=#d6d6d6
| 599862 ||  || — || November 11, 2010 || Mount Lemmon || Mount Lemmon Survey ||  || align=right | 2.5 km || 
|-id=863 bgcolor=#fefefe
| 599863 ||  || — || February 12, 2015 || Haleakala || Pan-STARRS ||  || align=right data-sort-value="0.67" | 670 m || 
|-id=864 bgcolor=#d6d6d6
| 599864 ||  || — || October 2, 2015 || Mount Lemmon || Mount Lemmon Survey ||  || align=right | 2.3 km || 
|-id=865 bgcolor=#C2FFFF
| 599865 ||  || — || February 10, 2013 || Haleakala || Pan-STARRS || L4 || align=right | 6.6 km || 
|-id=866 bgcolor=#d6d6d6
| 599866 ||  || — || December 14, 2010 || Mount Lemmon || Mount Lemmon Survey ||  || align=right | 2.3 km || 
|-id=867 bgcolor=#d6d6d6
| 599867 ||  || — || December 9, 2010 || Kitt Peak || Spacewatch ||  || align=right | 2.7 km || 
|-id=868 bgcolor=#d6d6d6
| 599868 ||  || — || December 3, 2010 || Mount Lemmon || Mount Lemmon Survey ||  || align=right | 2.9 km || 
|-id=869 bgcolor=#d6d6d6
| 599869 ||  || — || December 10, 2010 || Mount Lemmon || Mount Lemmon Survey ||  || align=right | 2.7 km || 
|-id=870 bgcolor=#d6d6d6
| 599870 ||  || — || December 4, 2010 || Mount Lemmon || Mount Lemmon Survey ||  || align=right | 2.2 km || 
|-id=871 bgcolor=#d6d6d6
| 599871 ||  || — || December 13, 2010 || Mount Lemmon || Mount Lemmon Survey ||  || align=right | 3.4 km || 
|-id=872 bgcolor=#fefefe
| 599872 ||  || — || December 4, 2010 || Mount Lemmon || Mount Lemmon Survey ||  || align=right data-sort-value="0.66" | 660 m || 
|-id=873 bgcolor=#fefefe
| 599873 ||  || — || November 12, 2010 || Kitt Peak || Spacewatch ||  || align=right data-sort-value="0.61" | 610 m || 
|-id=874 bgcolor=#fefefe
| 599874 ||  || — || December 25, 2010 || Mount Lemmon || Mount Lemmon Survey ||  || align=right data-sort-value="0.80" | 800 m || 
|-id=875 bgcolor=#d6d6d6
| 599875 ||  || — || December 25, 2010 || Mount Lemmon || Mount Lemmon Survey ||  || align=right | 2.5 km || 
|-id=876 bgcolor=#fefefe
| 599876 ||  || — || January 6, 2011 || Haleakala || Pan-STARRS || H || align=right data-sort-value="0.58" | 580 m || 
|-id=877 bgcolor=#d6d6d6
| 599877 ||  || — || December 10, 2010 || Kitt Peak || Spacewatch ||  || align=right | 3.6 km || 
|-id=878 bgcolor=#d6d6d6
| 599878 ||  || — || January 2, 2011 || Mount Lemmon || Mount Lemmon Survey ||  || align=right | 2.8 km || 
|-id=879 bgcolor=#C2FFFF
| 599879 ||  || — || November 8, 2010 || Mount Lemmon || Mount Lemmon Survey || L4 || align=right | 7.2 km || 
|-id=880 bgcolor=#d6d6d6
| 599880 ||  || — || January 28, 2006 || Mount Lemmon || Mount Lemmon Survey ||  || align=right | 2.2 km || 
|-id=881 bgcolor=#d6d6d6
| 599881 ||  || — || January 9, 2011 || Mount Lemmon || Mount Lemmon Survey ||  || align=right | 2.3 km || 
|-id=882 bgcolor=#d6d6d6
| 599882 ||  || — || January 31, 2006 || Catalina || CSS ||  || align=right | 3.2 km || 
|-id=883 bgcolor=#d6d6d6
| 599883 ||  || — || January 10, 2011 || Kitt Peak || Spacewatch || Tj (2.99) || align=right | 3.4 km || 
|-id=884 bgcolor=#d6d6d6
| 599884 ||  || — || January 9, 2011 || Kitt Peak || Spacewatch || TIR || align=right | 2.4 km || 
|-id=885 bgcolor=#fefefe
| 599885 ||  || — || January 10, 2011 || Mount Lemmon || Mount Lemmon Survey ||  || align=right data-sort-value="0.52" | 520 m || 
|-id=886 bgcolor=#fefefe
| 599886 ||  || — || January 27, 2004 || Kitt Peak || Spacewatch ||  || align=right data-sort-value="0.82" | 820 m || 
|-id=887 bgcolor=#fefefe
| 599887 ||  || — || January 11, 2011 || Mount Lemmon || Mount Lemmon Survey ||  || align=right data-sort-value="0.57" | 570 m || 
|-id=888 bgcolor=#fefefe
| 599888 ||  || — || January 11, 2011 || Catalina || CSS ||  || align=right data-sort-value="0.81" | 810 m || 
|-id=889 bgcolor=#FA8072
| 599889 ||  || — || January 8, 2011 || Catalina || CSS ||  || align=right | 1.1 km || 
|-id=890 bgcolor=#d6d6d6
| 599890 ||  || — || January 14, 2011 || Mount Lemmon || Mount Lemmon Survey ||  || align=right | 2.4 km || 
|-id=891 bgcolor=#fefefe
| 599891 ||  || — || March 30, 2008 || Kitt Peak || Spacewatch ||  || align=right data-sort-value="0.62" | 620 m || 
|-id=892 bgcolor=#fefefe
| 599892 ||  || — || January 10, 2011 || Mount Lemmon || Mount Lemmon Survey ||  || align=right data-sort-value="0.84" | 840 m || 
|-id=893 bgcolor=#d6d6d6
| 599893 ||  || — || July 26, 2015 || Haleakala || Pan-STARRS ||  || align=right | 3.4 km || 
|-id=894 bgcolor=#d6d6d6
| 599894 ||  || — || November 1, 2015 || Mount Lemmon || Mount Lemmon Survey ||  || align=right | 2.5 km || 
|-id=895 bgcolor=#C2FFFF
| 599895 ||  || — || February 3, 2012 || Haleakala || Pan-STARRS || L4 || align=right | 8.1 km || 
|-id=896 bgcolor=#d6d6d6
| 599896 ||  || — || January 13, 2011 || Mount Lemmon || Mount Lemmon Survey ||  || align=right | 2.7 km || 
|-id=897 bgcolor=#d6d6d6
| 599897 ||  || — || January 14, 2011 || Mount Lemmon || Mount Lemmon Survey ||  || align=right | 2.7 km || 
|-id=898 bgcolor=#fefefe
| 599898 ||  || — || January 8, 2011 || Catalina || CSS || H || align=right data-sort-value="0.54" | 540 m || 
|-id=899 bgcolor=#E9E9E9
| 599899 ||  || — || November 28, 2014 || Haleakala || Pan-STARRS ||  || align=right data-sort-value="0.86" | 860 m || 
|-id=900 bgcolor=#d6d6d6
| 599900 ||  || — || January 11, 2011 || Catalina || CSS ||  || align=right | 2.1 km || 
|}

599901–600000 

|-bgcolor=#E9E9E9
| 599901 ||  || — || January 10, 2011 || Mount Lemmon || Mount Lemmon Survey ||  || align=right | 1.2 km || 
|-id=902 bgcolor=#E9E9E9
| 599902 ||  || — || January 13, 2011 || Mount Lemmon || Mount Lemmon Survey ||  || align=right | 1.1 km || 
|-id=903 bgcolor=#d6d6d6
| 599903 ||  || — || January 14, 2011 || Mount Lemmon || Mount Lemmon Survey ||  || align=right | 2.1 km || 
|-id=904 bgcolor=#fefefe
| 599904 ||  || — || January 8, 2011 || Mount Lemmon || Mount Lemmon Survey ||  || align=right data-sort-value="0.66" | 660 m || 
|-id=905 bgcolor=#d6d6d6
| 599905 ||  || — || January 16, 2011 || Mount Lemmon || Mount Lemmon Survey ||  || align=right | 2.3 km || 
|-id=906 bgcolor=#d6d6d6
| 599906 ||  || — || January 16, 2011 || Mount Lemmon || Mount Lemmon Survey ||  || align=right | 1.8 km || 
|-id=907 bgcolor=#fefefe
| 599907 ||  || — || January 16, 2011 || Mount Lemmon || Mount Lemmon Survey ||  || align=right data-sort-value="0.60" | 600 m || 
|-id=908 bgcolor=#fefefe
| 599908 ||  || — || January 4, 2011 || Mount Lemmon || Mount Lemmon Survey ||  || align=right data-sort-value="0.60" | 600 m || 
|-id=909 bgcolor=#fefefe
| 599909 ||  || — || October 16, 2002 || Palomar || NEAT ||  || align=right data-sort-value="0.93" | 930 m || 
|-id=910 bgcolor=#fefefe
| 599910 ||  || — || February 9, 2003 || Desert Eagle || W. K. Y. Yeung || H || align=right data-sort-value="0.54" | 540 m || 
|-id=911 bgcolor=#d6d6d6
| 599911 ||  || — || January 12, 2011 || Kitt Peak || Spacewatch ||  || align=right | 3.5 km || 
|-id=912 bgcolor=#fefefe
| 599912 ||  || — || January 28, 2011 || Kitt Peak || Spacewatch ||  || align=right data-sort-value="0.54" | 540 m || 
|-id=913 bgcolor=#fefefe
| 599913 ||  || — || January 30, 2011 || Piszkesteto || Z. Kuli, K. Sárneczky ||  || align=right data-sort-value="0.72" | 720 m || 
|-id=914 bgcolor=#fefefe
| 599914 ||  || — || December 8, 2010 || Mount Lemmon || Mount Lemmon Survey ||  || align=right data-sort-value="0.65" | 650 m || 
|-id=915 bgcolor=#fefefe
| 599915 ||  || — || January 26, 2011 || Mount Lemmon || Mount Lemmon Survey ||  || align=right data-sort-value="0.70" | 700 m || 
|-id=916 bgcolor=#E9E9E9
| 599916 ||  || — || January 16, 2011 || Mount Lemmon || Mount Lemmon Survey ||  || align=right | 1.3 km || 
|-id=917 bgcolor=#d6d6d6
| 599917 ||  || — || September 4, 2003 || Kitt Peak || Spacewatch ||  || align=right | 2.7 km || 
|-id=918 bgcolor=#d6d6d6
| 599918 ||  || — || February 6, 2006 || Mount Lemmon || Mount Lemmon Survey ||  || align=right | 3.0 km || 
|-id=919 bgcolor=#fefefe
| 599919 ||  || — || April 7, 2008 || Kitt Peak || Spacewatch ||  || align=right data-sort-value="0.54" | 540 m || 
|-id=920 bgcolor=#d6d6d6
| 599920 ||  || — || January 16, 2005 || Goodricke-Pigott || R. A. Tucker || Tj (2.97) || align=right | 3.4 km || 
|-id=921 bgcolor=#fefefe
| 599921 ||  || — || January 13, 2011 || Kitt Peak || Spacewatch ||  || align=right data-sort-value="0.66" | 660 m || 
|-id=922 bgcolor=#fefefe
| 599922 ||  || — || January 29, 2011 || Kitt Peak || Spacewatch ||  || align=right data-sort-value="0.80" | 800 m || 
|-id=923 bgcolor=#fefefe
| 599923 ||  || — || October 2, 2006 || Mount Lemmon || Mount Lemmon Survey ||  || align=right data-sort-value="0.52" | 520 m || 
|-id=924 bgcolor=#d6d6d6
| 599924 ||  || — || February 5, 2011 || Haleakala || Pan-STARRS ||  || align=right | 2.6 km || 
|-id=925 bgcolor=#fefefe
| 599925 ||  || — || April 19, 2004 || Kitt Peak || Spacewatch ||  || align=right data-sort-value="0.65" | 650 m || 
|-id=926 bgcolor=#fefefe
| 599926 ||  || — || October 16, 2006 || Catalina || CSS ||  || align=right data-sort-value="0.60" | 600 m || 
|-id=927 bgcolor=#E9E9E9
| 599927 ||  || — || January 27, 2007 || Kitt Peak || Spacewatch || EUN || align=right data-sort-value="0.81" | 810 m || 
|-id=928 bgcolor=#E9E9E9
| 599928 ||  || — || February 10, 2011 || Mount Lemmon || Mount Lemmon Survey ||  || align=right data-sort-value="0.56" | 560 m || 
|-id=929 bgcolor=#fefefe
| 599929 ||  || — || February 12, 2011 || Mount Lemmon || Mount Lemmon Survey ||  || align=right data-sort-value="0.57" | 570 m || 
|-id=930 bgcolor=#E9E9E9
| 599930 ||  || — || January 29, 2011 || Kitt Peak || Spacewatch ||  || align=right | 1.4 km || 
|-id=931 bgcolor=#fefefe
| 599931 ||  || — || January 8, 2011 || Mount Lemmon || Mount Lemmon Survey ||  || align=right data-sort-value="0.89" | 890 m || 
|-id=932 bgcolor=#d6d6d6
| 599932 ||  || — || January 29, 2011 || Mount Lemmon || Mount Lemmon Survey ||  || align=right | 2.1 km || 
|-id=933 bgcolor=#d6d6d6
| 599933 ||  || — || January 8, 2011 || Mount Lemmon || Mount Lemmon Survey ||  || align=right | 2.2 km || 
|-id=934 bgcolor=#fefefe
| 599934 ||  || — || January 29, 2011 || Mount Lemmon || Mount Lemmon Survey ||  || align=right data-sort-value="0.49" | 490 m || 
|-id=935 bgcolor=#d6d6d6
| 599935 ||  || — || January 29, 2011 || Mount Lemmon || Mount Lemmon Survey ||  || align=right | 2.2 km || 
|-id=936 bgcolor=#E9E9E9
| 599936 ||  || — || January 27, 2011 || Mount Lemmon || Mount Lemmon Survey ||  || align=right data-sort-value="0.71" | 710 m || 
|-id=937 bgcolor=#fefefe
| 599937 ||  || — || January 12, 2011 || Kitt Peak || Spacewatch ||  || align=right data-sort-value="0.59" | 590 m || 
|-id=938 bgcolor=#fefefe
| 599938 ||  || — || February 5, 2011 || Haleakala || Pan-STARRS ||  || align=right data-sort-value="0.65" | 650 m || 
|-id=939 bgcolor=#E9E9E9
| 599939 ||  || — || January 30, 2011 || Mount Lemmon || Mount Lemmon Survey ||  || align=right | 2.4 km || 
|-id=940 bgcolor=#E9E9E9
| 599940 ||  || — || March 11, 2007 || Kitt Peak || Spacewatch ||  || align=right | 1.3 km || 
|-id=941 bgcolor=#fefefe
| 599941 ||  || — || January 27, 2011 || Mount Lemmon || Mount Lemmon Survey ||  || align=right data-sort-value="0.67" | 670 m || 
|-id=942 bgcolor=#d6d6d6
| 599942 ||  || — || January 4, 2017 || Haleakala || Pan-STARRS ||  || align=right | 3.1 km || 
|-id=943 bgcolor=#fefefe
| 599943 ||  || — || February 8, 2011 || Mount Lemmon || Mount Lemmon Survey ||  || align=right data-sort-value="0.57" | 570 m || 
|-id=944 bgcolor=#d6d6d6
| 599944 ||  || — || February 26, 2011 || Mount Lemmon || Mount Lemmon Survey ||  || align=right | 2.0 km || 
|-id=945 bgcolor=#fefefe
| 599945 ||  || — || February 5, 2011 || Haleakala || Pan-STARRS ||  || align=right data-sort-value="0.72" | 720 m || 
|-id=946 bgcolor=#fefefe
| 599946 ||  || — || January 28, 2011 || Mount Lemmon || Mount Lemmon Survey ||  || align=right data-sort-value="0.57" | 570 m || 
|-id=947 bgcolor=#d6d6d6
| 599947 ||  || — || January 26, 2011 || Kitt Peak || Spacewatch ||  || align=right | 2.1 km || 
|-id=948 bgcolor=#d6d6d6
| 599948 ||  || — || August 27, 2014 || Haleakala || Pan-STARRS ||  || align=right | 2.3 km || 
|-id=949 bgcolor=#fefefe
| 599949 ||  || — || January 29, 2011 || Catalina || CSS || H || align=right data-sort-value="0.63" | 630 m || 
|-id=950 bgcolor=#d6d6d6
| 599950 ||  || — || February 7, 2011 || Mount Lemmon || Mount Lemmon Survey ||  || align=right | 2.3 km || 
|-id=951 bgcolor=#fefefe
| 599951 ||  || — || October 10, 2002 || Palomar || NEAT ||  || align=right data-sort-value="0.68" | 680 m || 
|-id=952 bgcolor=#E9E9E9
| 599952 ||  || — || January 30, 2011 || Haleakala || Pan-STARRS ||  || align=right data-sort-value="0.77" | 770 m || 
|-id=953 bgcolor=#fefefe
| 599953 ||  || — || January 28, 2011 || Kitt Peak || Spacewatch ||  || align=right data-sort-value="0.63" | 630 m || 
|-id=954 bgcolor=#d6d6d6
| 599954 ||  || — || January 30, 2011 || Mount Lemmon || Mount Lemmon Survey ||  || align=right | 2.3 km || 
|-id=955 bgcolor=#fefefe
| 599955 ||  || — || February 3, 2003 || Kitt Peak || Spacewatch || H || align=right data-sort-value="0.53" | 530 m || 
|-id=956 bgcolor=#fefefe
| 599956 ||  || — || March 30, 2008 || Kitt Peak || Spacewatch ||  || align=right data-sort-value="0.66" | 660 m || 
|-id=957 bgcolor=#d6d6d6
| 599957 ||  || — || September 25, 2009 || Sandlot || G. Hug ||  || align=right | 2.3 km || 
|-id=958 bgcolor=#E9E9E9
| 599958 ||  || — || February 7, 2011 || Mount Lemmon || Mount Lemmon Survey ||  || align=right | 1.7 km || 
|-id=959 bgcolor=#d6d6d6
| 599959 ||  || — || August 26, 2009 || Catalina || CSS ||  || align=right | 3.1 km || 
|-id=960 bgcolor=#d6d6d6
| 599960 ||  || — || September 19, 2003 || Palomar || NEAT || Tj (2.99) || align=right | 4.3 km || 
|-id=961 bgcolor=#E9E9E9
| 599961 ||  || — || January 30, 2011 || Mount Lemmon || Mount Lemmon Survey ||  || align=right data-sort-value="0.79" | 790 m || 
|-id=962 bgcolor=#E9E9E9
| 599962 ||  || — || July 22, 2003 || Haleakala || AMOS ||  || align=right | 2.1 km || 
|-id=963 bgcolor=#FA8072
| 599963 ||  || — || February 17, 2007 || Socorro || LINEAR ||  || align=right data-sort-value="0.50" | 500 m || 
|-id=964 bgcolor=#fefefe
| 599964 ||  || — || January 26, 2011 || Mount Lemmon || Mount Lemmon Survey ||  || align=right data-sort-value="0.77" | 770 m || 
|-id=965 bgcolor=#d6d6d6
| 599965 ||  || — || January 12, 2011 || Mount Lemmon || Mount Lemmon Survey || 7:4 || align=right | 3.1 km || 
|-id=966 bgcolor=#fefefe
| 599966 ||  || — || February 8, 2011 || Mount Lemmon || Mount Lemmon Survey ||  || align=right data-sort-value="0.67" | 670 m || 
|-id=967 bgcolor=#fefefe
| 599967 ||  || — || February 8, 2011 || Mount Lemmon || Mount Lemmon Survey ||  || align=right data-sort-value="0.60" | 600 m || 
|-id=968 bgcolor=#E9E9E9
| 599968 ||  || — || February 8, 2011 || Mount Lemmon || Mount Lemmon Survey ||  || align=right | 1.2 km || 
|-id=969 bgcolor=#fefefe
| 599969 ||  || — || October 10, 2002 || Palomar || NEAT || NYS || align=right data-sort-value="0.92" | 920 m || 
|-id=970 bgcolor=#E9E9E9
| 599970 ||  || — || February 13, 2002 || Kitt Peak || Spacewatch ||  || align=right | 2.1 km || 
|-id=971 bgcolor=#fefefe
| 599971 ||  || — || March 7, 2003 || Palomar || NEAT || H || align=right data-sort-value="0.79" | 790 m || 
|-id=972 bgcolor=#fefefe
| 599972 ||  || — || February 6, 2011 || Catalina || CSS ||  || align=right data-sort-value="0.77" | 770 m || 
|-id=973 bgcolor=#E9E9E9
| 599973 ||  || — || March 2, 2011 || Mount Lemmon || Mount Lemmon Survey ||  || align=right | 1.1 km || 
|-id=974 bgcolor=#fefefe
| 599974 ||  || — || February 5, 2011 || Haleakala || Pan-STARRS ||  || align=right data-sort-value="0.57" | 570 m || 
|-id=975 bgcolor=#fefefe
| 599975 ||  || — || January 8, 2011 || Mount Lemmon || Mount Lemmon Survey || H || align=right data-sort-value="0.54" | 540 m || 
|-id=976 bgcolor=#E9E9E9
| 599976 ||  || — || September 22, 2009 || Kitt Peak || Spacewatch ||  || align=right | 1.1 km || 
|-id=977 bgcolor=#d6d6d6
| 599977 ||  || — || February 5, 2011 || Haleakala || Pan-STARRS || 7:4 || align=right | 2.7 km || 
|-id=978 bgcolor=#fefefe
| 599978 ||  || — || February 5, 2011 || Haleakala || Pan-STARRS ||  || align=right data-sort-value="0.68" | 680 m || 
|-id=979 bgcolor=#fefefe
| 599979 ||  || — || February 5, 2011 || Haleakala || Pan-STARRS ||  || align=right data-sort-value="0.66" | 660 m || 
|-id=980 bgcolor=#d6d6d6
| 599980 ||  || — || September 7, 2008 || Mount Lemmon || Mount Lemmon Survey ||  || align=right | 2.3 km || 
|-id=981 bgcolor=#fefefe
| 599981 ||  || — || February 11, 2011 || Mount Lemmon || Mount Lemmon Survey ||  || align=right data-sort-value="0.67" | 670 m || 
|-id=982 bgcolor=#fefefe
| 599982 ||  || — || February 12, 2011 || Mount Lemmon || Mount Lemmon Survey ||  || align=right data-sort-value="0.62" | 620 m || 
|-id=983 bgcolor=#fefefe
| 599983 ||  || — || February 28, 2014 || Haleakala || Pan-STARRS ||  || align=right data-sort-value="0.53" | 530 m || 
|-id=984 bgcolor=#d6d6d6
| 599984 ||  || — || February 4, 2011 || Catalina || CSS || Tj (2.98) || align=right | 3.0 km || 
|-id=985 bgcolor=#d6d6d6
| 599985 ||  || — || February 13, 2011 || Mount Lemmon || Mount Lemmon Survey ||  || align=right | 1.8 km || 
|-id=986 bgcolor=#E9E9E9
| 599986 ||  || — || February 12, 2011 || Mount Lemmon || Mount Lemmon Survey ||  || align=right | 1.3 km || 
|-id=987 bgcolor=#fefefe
| 599987 ||  || — || January 28, 2011 || Mount Lemmon || Mount Lemmon Survey ||  || align=right data-sort-value="0.49" | 490 m || 
|-id=988 bgcolor=#fefefe
| 599988 ||  || — || September 12, 2002 || Palomar || NEAT ||  || align=right data-sort-value="0.80" | 800 m || 
|-id=989 bgcolor=#E9E9E9
| 599989 ||  || — || March 11, 2007 || Mount Lemmon || Mount Lemmon Survey ||  || align=right data-sort-value="0.83" | 830 m || 
|-id=990 bgcolor=#fefefe
| 599990 ||  || — || June 30, 2008 || Kitt Peak || Spacewatch ||  || align=right data-sort-value="0.71" | 710 m || 
|-id=991 bgcolor=#fefefe
| 599991 ||  || — || October 15, 2002 || Palomar || NEAT ||  || align=right | 1.2 km || 
|-id=992 bgcolor=#fefefe
| 599992 ||  || — || February 8, 2011 || Catalina || CSS ||  || align=right data-sort-value="0.91" | 910 m || 
|-id=993 bgcolor=#E9E9E9
| 599993 ||  || — || February 26, 2011 || Mount Lemmon || Mount Lemmon Survey ||  || align=right | 1.6 km || 
|-id=994 bgcolor=#d6d6d6
| 599994 ||  || — || February 4, 2011 || Catalina || CSS ||  || align=right | 2.4 km || 
|-id=995 bgcolor=#fefefe
| 599995 ||  || — || February 25, 2011 || Kitt Peak || Spacewatch || H || align=right data-sort-value="0.49" | 490 m || 
|-id=996 bgcolor=#fefefe
| 599996 ||  || — || August 23, 2001 || Kitt Peak || Spacewatch ||  || align=right | 1.1 km || 
|-id=997 bgcolor=#fefefe
| 599997 ||  || — || February 8, 2011 || Mount Lemmon || Mount Lemmon Survey ||  || align=right data-sort-value="0.95" | 950 m || 
|-id=998 bgcolor=#E9E9E9
| 599998 ||  || — || March 2, 2011 || Catalina || CSS ||  || align=right | 2.6 km || 
|-id=999 bgcolor=#fefefe
| 599999 ||  || — || March 6, 2011 || Mount Lemmon || Mount Lemmon Survey ||  || align=right data-sort-value="0.63" | 630 m || 
|-id=000 bgcolor=#fefefe
| 600000 ||  || — || February 25, 2011 || Mount Lemmon || Mount Lemmon Survey ||  || align=right data-sort-value="0.68" | 680 m || 
|}

References

External links 
 Discovery Circumstances: Numbered Minor Planets (595001)–(600000) (IAU Minor Planet Center)

0599